

182001–182100 

|-bgcolor=#fefefe
| 182001 ||  || — || November 17, 1999 || Kitt Peak || Spacewatch || — || align=right data-sort-value="0.89" | 890 m || 
|-id=002 bgcolor=#FA8072
| 182002 ||  || — || December 4, 1999 || Oaxaca || J. M. Roe || — || align=right | 1.5 km || 
|-id=003 bgcolor=#fefefe
| 182003 ||  || — || December 5, 1999 || Socorro || LINEAR || V || align=right data-sort-value="0.98" | 980 m || 
|-id=004 bgcolor=#fefefe
| 182004 ||  || — || December 7, 1999 || Socorro || LINEAR || H || align=right data-sort-value="0.89" | 890 m || 
|-id=005 bgcolor=#fefefe
| 182005 ||  || — || December 6, 1999 || Socorro || LINEAR || FLO || align=right data-sort-value="0.92" | 920 m || 
|-id=006 bgcolor=#d6d6d6
| 182006 ||  || — || December 7, 1999 || Socorro || LINEAR || — || align=right | 5.3 km || 
|-id=007 bgcolor=#fefefe
| 182007 ||  || — || December 7, 1999 || Socorro || LINEAR || — || align=right | 1.4 km || 
|-id=008 bgcolor=#fefefe
| 182008 ||  || — || December 7, 1999 || Socorro || LINEAR || NYS || align=right | 1.0 km || 
|-id=009 bgcolor=#d6d6d6
| 182009 ||  || — || December 7, 1999 || Catalina || CSS || — || align=right | 5.5 km || 
|-id=010 bgcolor=#fefefe
| 182010 ||  || — || December 12, 1999 || Socorro || LINEAR || — || align=right | 1.2 km || 
|-id=011 bgcolor=#E9E9E9
| 182011 ||  || — || December 8, 1999 || Socorro || LINEAR || — || align=right | 2.9 km || 
|-id=012 bgcolor=#fefefe
| 182012 ||  || — || December 15, 1999 || Kitt Peak || Spacewatch || NYS || align=right data-sort-value="0.92" | 920 m || 
|-id=013 bgcolor=#fefefe
| 182013 ||  || — || December 13, 1999 || Kitt Peak || Spacewatch || — || align=right | 1.0 km || 
|-id=014 bgcolor=#E9E9E9
| 182014 ||  || — || December 14, 1999 || Kitt Peak || Spacewatch || — || align=right | 1.6 km || 
|-id=015 bgcolor=#fefefe
| 182015 ||  || — || December 6, 1999 || Socorro || LINEAR || NYS || align=right | 3.5 km || 
|-id=016 bgcolor=#E9E9E9
| 182016 ||  || — || December 12, 1999 || Kitt Peak || Spacewatch || — || align=right | 1.8 km || 
|-id=017 bgcolor=#fefefe
| 182017 ||  || — || December 27, 1999 || Kitt Peak || Spacewatch || NYS || align=right data-sort-value="0.90" | 900 m || 
|-id=018 bgcolor=#fefefe
| 182018 ||  || — || December 27, 1999 || Kitt Peak || Spacewatch || — || align=right data-sort-value="0.85" | 850 m || 
|-id=019 bgcolor=#fefefe
| 182019 ||  || — || December 31, 1999 || Kitt Peak || Spacewatch || MAS || align=right data-sort-value="0.90" | 900 m || 
|-id=020 bgcolor=#fefefe
| 182020 ||  || — || December 31, 1999 || Kitt Peak || Spacewatch || NYS || align=right | 1.0 km || 
|-id=021 bgcolor=#fefefe
| 182021 ||  || — || January 4, 2000 || Kitt Peak || Spacewatch || NYS || align=right data-sort-value="0.91" | 910 m || 
|-id=022 bgcolor=#fefefe
| 182022 ||  || — || January 3, 2000 || Socorro || LINEAR || NYS || align=right | 1.1 km || 
|-id=023 bgcolor=#fefefe
| 182023 ||  || — || January 3, 2000 || Socorro || LINEAR || NYS || align=right | 1.0 km || 
|-id=024 bgcolor=#fefefe
| 182024 ||  || — || January 5, 2000 || Socorro || LINEAR || V || align=right | 1.3 km || 
|-id=025 bgcolor=#d6d6d6
| 182025 ||  || — || January 5, 2000 || Socorro || LINEAR || — || align=right | 7.2 km || 
|-id=026 bgcolor=#E9E9E9
| 182026 ||  || — || January 5, 2000 || Socorro || LINEAR || — || align=right | 1.4 km || 
|-id=027 bgcolor=#fefefe
| 182027 ||  || — || January 6, 2000 || Socorro || LINEAR || MAS || align=right | 1.2 km || 
|-id=028 bgcolor=#fefefe
| 182028 ||  || — || January 8, 2000 || Socorro || LINEAR || — || align=right | 2.8 km || 
|-id=029 bgcolor=#fefefe
| 182029 ||  || — || January 21, 2000 || Socorro || LINEAR || — || align=right | 1.3 km || 
|-id=030 bgcolor=#E9E9E9
| 182030 ||  || — || January 29, 2000 || Socorro || LINEAR || — || align=right | 2.5 km || 
|-id=031 bgcolor=#fefefe
| 182031 ||  || — || January 29, 2000 || Kitt Peak || Spacewatch || — || align=right | 1.4 km || 
|-id=032 bgcolor=#fefefe
| 182032 ||  || — || January 29, 2000 || Kitt Peak || Spacewatch || — || align=right | 1.2 km || 
|-id=033 bgcolor=#fefefe
| 182033 ||  || — || February 2, 2000 || Socorro || LINEAR || — || align=right | 1.5 km || 
|-id=034 bgcolor=#E9E9E9
| 182034 ||  || — || February 2, 2000 || Socorro || LINEAR || — || align=right | 2.3 km || 
|-id=035 bgcolor=#E9E9E9
| 182035 ||  || — || February 3, 2000 || Socorro || LINEAR || — || align=right | 1.8 km || 
|-id=036 bgcolor=#E9E9E9
| 182036 ||  || — || February 2, 2000 || Socorro || LINEAR || — || align=right | 2.5 km || 
|-id=037 bgcolor=#E9E9E9
| 182037 ||  || — || February 2, 2000 || Socorro || LINEAR || — || align=right | 2.1 km || 
|-id=038 bgcolor=#E9E9E9
| 182038 ||  || — || February 3, 2000 || Socorro || LINEAR || — || align=right | 1.9 km || 
|-id=039 bgcolor=#fefefe
| 182039 ||  || — || February 1, 2000 || Kitt Peak || Spacewatch || MAS || align=right | 1.0 km || 
|-id=040 bgcolor=#E9E9E9
| 182040 ||  || — || February 7, 2000 || Kitt Peak || Spacewatch || — || align=right | 1.2 km || 
|-id=041 bgcolor=#E9E9E9
| 182041 ||  || — || February 7, 2000 || Kitt Peak || Spacewatch || — || align=right | 1.0 km || 
|-id=042 bgcolor=#E9E9E9
| 182042 ||  || — || February 4, 2000 || Socorro || LINEAR || — || align=right | 1.7 km || 
|-id=043 bgcolor=#E9E9E9
| 182043 ||  || — || February 11, 2000 || Kitt Peak || Spacewatch || — || align=right | 1.2 km || 
|-id=044 bgcolor=#fefefe
| 182044 Ryschkewitsch ||  ||  || February 5, 2000 || Kitt Peak || M. W. Buie || MAS || align=right | 1.2 km || 
|-id=045 bgcolor=#fefefe
| 182045 ||  || — || February 3, 2000 || Kitt Peak || Spacewatch || — || align=right | 1.3 km || 
|-id=046 bgcolor=#E9E9E9
| 182046 ||  || — || February 11, 2000 || Socorro || LINEAR || — || align=right | 2.6 km || 
|-id=047 bgcolor=#fefefe
| 182047 ||  || — || February 8, 2000 || Kitt Peak || Spacewatch || V || align=right | 1.1 km || 
|-id=048 bgcolor=#fefefe
| 182048 ||  || — || February 29, 2000 || Socorro || LINEAR || H || align=right data-sort-value="0.82" | 820 m || 
|-id=049 bgcolor=#E9E9E9
| 182049 ||  || — || February 29, 2000 || Socorro || LINEAR || — || align=right | 3.1 km || 
|-id=050 bgcolor=#E9E9E9
| 182050 ||  || — || February 29, 2000 || Socorro || LINEAR || — || align=right | 1.7 km || 
|-id=051 bgcolor=#fefefe
| 182051 ||  || — || February 29, 2000 || Socorro || LINEAR || MAS || align=right | 1.4 km || 
|-id=052 bgcolor=#E9E9E9
| 182052 ||  || — || February 29, 2000 || Socorro || LINEAR || — || align=right | 1.00 km || 
|-id=053 bgcolor=#E9E9E9
| 182053 ||  || — || February 29, 2000 || Socorro || LINEAR || — || align=right | 2.0 km || 
|-id=054 bgcolor=#E9E9E9
| 182054 ||  || — || February 26, 2000 || Kitt Peak || Spacewatch || — || align=right | 1.2 km || 
|-id=055 bgcolor=#E9E9E9
| 182055 ||  || — || February 27, 2000 || Kitt Peak || Spacewatch || — || align=right | 1.5 km || 
|-id=056 bgcolor=#E9E9E9
| 182056 ||  || — || February 28, 2000 || Socorro || LINEAR || — || align=right | 2.6 km || 
|-id=057 bgcolor=#fefefe
| 182057 ||  || — || February 29, 2000 || Socorro || LINEAR || — || align=right | 4.1 km || 
|-id=058 bgcolor=#fefefe
| 182058 ||  || — || February 29, 2000 || Socorro || LINEAR || V || align=right | 1.1 km || 
|-id=059 bgcolor=#E9E9E9
| 182059 ||  || — || February 28, 2000 || Kitt Peak || Spacewatch || — || align=right | 1.8 km || 
|-id=060 bgcolor=#E9E9E9
| 182060 ||  || — || February 25, 2000 || Catalina || CSS || — || align=right | 2.0 km || 
|-id=061 bgcolor=#fefefe
| 182061 ||  || — || March 3, 2000 || Socorro || LINEAR || — || align=right | 1.0 km || 
|-id=062 bgcolor=#d6d6d6
| 182062 ||  || — || March 3, 2000 || Kitt Peak || Spacewatch || SHU3:2 || align=right | 6.5 km || 
|-id=063 bgcolor=#E9E9E9
| 182063 ||  || — || March 5, 2000 || Socorro || LINEAR || — || align=right | 1.4 km || 
|-id=064 bgcolor=#E9E9E9
| 182064 ||  || — || March 5, 2000 || Socorro || LINEAR || — || align=right | 2.3 km || 
|-id=065 bgcolor=#E9E9E9
| 182065 ||  || — || March 6, 2000 || Haleakala || NEAT || — || align=right | 1.7 km || 
|-id=066 bgcolor=#fefefe
| 182066 ||  || — || March 3, 2000 || Socorro || LINEAR || — || align=right | 1.1 km || 
|-id=067 bgcolor=#fefefe
| 182067 ||  || — || March 29, 2000 || Socorro || LINEAR || H || align=right data-sort-value="0.96" | 960 m || 
|-id=068 bgcolor=#E9E9E9
| 182068 ||  || — || March 30, 2000 || Kitt Peak || Spacewatch || — || align=right | 3.3 km || 
|-id=069 bgcolor=#d6d6d6
| 182069 ||  || — || April 5, 2000 || Socorro || LINEAR || SHU3:2 || align=right | 9.0 km || 
|-id=070 bgcolor=#E9E9E9
| 182070 ||  || — || April 5, 2000 || Socorro || LINEAR || MAR || align=right | 1.8 km || 
|-id=071 bgcolor=#E9E9E9
| 182071 ||  || — || April 5, 2000 || Socorro || LINEAR || ADE || align=right | 3.2 km || 
|-id=072 bgcolor=#fefefe
| 182072 ||  || — || April 7, 2000 || Socorro || LINEAR || H || align=right | 1.0 km || 
|-id=073 bgcolor=#E9E9E9
| 182073 ||  || — || April 7, 2000 || Socorro || LINEAR || — || align=right | 1.5 km || 
|-id=074 bgcolor=#E9E9E9
| 182074 ||  || — || April 3, 2000 || Kitt Peak || Spacewatch || — || align=right | 1.9 km || 
|-id=075 bgcolor=#E9E9E9
| 182075 ||  || — || April 3, 2000 || Kitt Peak || Spacewatch || — || align=right | 1.4 km || 
|-id=076 bgcolor=#E9E9E9
| 182076 ||  || — || April 5, 2000 || Kitt Peak || Spacewatch || — || align=right | 1.4 km || 
|-id=077 bgcolor=#d6d6d6
| 182077 ||  || — || April 7, 2000 || Kitt Peak || Spacewatch || — || align=right | 4.1 km || 
|-id=078 bgcolor=#fefefe
| 182078 ||  || — || April 5, 2000 || Anderson Mesa || LONEOS || H || align=right data-sort-value="0.65" | 650 m || 
|-id=079 bgcolor=#E9E9E9
| 182079 ||  || — || April 24, 2000 || Kitt Peak || Spacewatch || — || align=right | 1.1 km || 
|-id=080 bgcolor=#E9E9E9
| 182080 ||  || — || April 25, 2000 || Kitt Peak || Spacewatch || — || align=right | 1.3 km || 
|-id=081 bgcolor=#E9E9E9
| 182081 ||  || — || April 25, 2000 || Kitt Peak || Spacewatch || — || align=right | 1.4 km || 
|-id=082 bgcolor=#E9E9E9
| 182082 ||  || — || April 27, 2000 || Socorro || LINEAR || — || align=right | 1.7 km || 
|-id=083 bgcolor=#E9E9E9
| 182083 ||  || — || April 29, 2000 || Socorro || LINEAR || — || align=right | 2.0 km || 
|-id=084 bgcolor=#fefefe
| 182084 ||  || — || April 25, 2000 || Anderson Mesa || LONEOS || H || align=right data-sort-value="0.75" | 750 m || 
|-id=085 bgcolor=#E9E9E9
| 182085 ||  || — || April 25, 2000 || Anderson Mesa || LONEOS || — || align=right | 2.1 km || 
|-id=086 bgcolor=#E9E9E9
| 182086 ||  || — || April 29, 2000 || Socorro || LINEAR || — || align=right | 1.2 km || 
|-id=087 bgcolor=#fefefe
| 182087 ||  || — || April 28, 2000 || Anderson Mesa || LONEOS || H || align=right data-sort-value="0.92" | 920 m || 
|-id=088 bgcolor=#fefefe
| 182088 ||  || — || April 30, 2000 || Anderson Mesa || LONEOS || H || align=right | 1.3 km || 
|-id=089 bgcolor=#d6d6d6
| 182089 ||  || — || May 1, 2000 || Kitt Peak || Spacewatch || KOR || align=right | 1.9 km || 
|-id=090 bgcolor=#fefefe
| 182090 ||  || — || May 4, 2000 || Socorro || LINEAR || H || align=right | 1.2 km || 
|-id=091 bgcolor=#E9E9E9
| 182091 ||  || — || May 6, 2000 || Socorro || LINEAR || — || align=right | 1.4 km || 
|-id=092 bgcolor=#E9E9E9
| 182092 ||  || — || May 6, 2000 || Socorro || LINEAR || — || align=right | 1.8 km || 
|-id=093 bgcolor=#E9E9E9
| 182093 ||  || — || May 7, 2000 || Socorro || LINEAR || — || align=right | 1.2 km || 
|-id=094 bgcolor=#d6d6d6
| 182094 ||  || — || May 7, 2000 || Kitt Peak || Spacewatch || 3:2 || align=right | 5.7 km || 
|-id=095 bgcolor=#E9E9E9
| 182095 ||  || — || May 9, 2000 || Kitt Peak || Spacewatch || — || align=right | 1.6 km || 
|-id=096 bgcolor=#E9E9E9
| 182096 ||  || — || May 6, 2000 || Kitt Peak || Spacewatch || — || align=right | 1.3 km || 
|-id=097 bgcolor=#E9E9E9
| 182097 ||  || — || May 28, 2000 || Socorro || LINEAR || — || align=right | 1.1 km || 
|-id=098 bgcolor=#E9E9E9
| 182098 ||  || — || May 28, 2000 || Socorro || LINEAR || — || align=right | 1.8 km || 
|-id=099 bgcolor=#E9E9E9
| 182099 ||  || — || May 30, 2000 || Kitt Peak || Spacewatch || — || align=right | 1.3 km || 
|-id=100 bgcolor=#E9E9E9
| 182100 ||  || — || May 25, 2000 || Anderson Mesa || LONEOS || — || align=right | 1.8 km || 
|}

182101–182200 

|-bgcolor=#E9E9E9
| 182101 ||  || — || May 25, 2000 || Anderson Mesa || LONEOS || — || align=right | 1.9 km || 
|-id=102 bgcolor=#E9E9E9
| 182102 ||  || — || June 6, 2000 || Kitt Peak || Spacewatch || — || align=right | 2.9 km || 
|-id=103 bgcolor=#d6d6d6
| 182103 ||  || — || July 5, 2000 || Anderson Mesa || LONEOS || — || align=right | 4.6 km || 
|-id=104 bgcolor=#E9E9E9
| 182104 ||  || — || July 6, 2000 || Kitt Peak || Spacewatch || MIS || align=right | 4.5 km || 
|-id=105 bgcolor=#E9E9E9
| 182105 ||  || — || July 23, 2000 || Socorro || LINEAR || — || align=right | 2.0 km || 
|-id=106 bgcolor=#E9E9E9
| 182106 ||  || — || July 30, 2000 || Socorro || LINEAR || — || align=right | 3.1 km || 
|-id=107 bgcolor=#E9E9E9
| 182107 ||  || — || July 30, 2000 || Socorro || LINEAR || — || align=right | 2.7 km || 
|-id=108 bgcolor=#E9E9E9
| 182108 ||  || — || August 6, 2000 || Ametlla de Mar || J. Nomen || — || align=right | 4.8 km || 
|-id=109 bgcolor=#E9E9E9
| 182109 ||  || — || August 24, 2000 || Socorro || LINEAR || — || align=right | 3.9 km || 
|-id=110 bgcolor=#E9E9E9
| 182110 ||  || — || August 24, 2000 || Socorro || LINEAR || — || align=right | 3.2 km || 
|-id=111 bgcolor=#E9E9E9
| 182111 ||  || — || August 24, 2000 || Socorro || LINEAR || ADE || align=right | 3.8 km || 
|-id=112 bgcolor=#E9E9E9
| 182112 ||  || — || August 24, 2000 || Socorro || LINEAR || VIB || align=right | 2.8 km || 
|-id=113 bgcolor=#E9E9E9
| 182113 ||  || — || August 28, 2000 || Socorro || LINEAR || JUN || align=right | 2.3 km || 
|-id=114 bgcolor=#E9E9E9
| 182114 ||  || — || August 25, 2000 || Socorro || LINEAR || — || align=right | 3.7 km || 
|-id=115 bgcolor=#E9E9E9
| 182115 ||  || — || August 31, 2000 || Socorro || LINEAR || DOR || align=right | 3.9 km || 
|-id=116 bgcolor=#E9E9E9
| 182116 ||  || — || August 31, 2000 || Socorro || LINEAR || — || align=right | 4.3 km || 
|-id=117 bgcolor=#E9E9E9
| 182117 ||  || — || August 31, 2000 || Socorro || LINEAR || — || align=right | 2.3 km || 
|-id=118 bgcolor=#E9E9E9
| 182118 ||  || — || August 31, 2000 || Socorro || LINEAR || — || align=right | 3.3 km || 
|-id=119 bgcolor=#E9E9E9
| 182119 ||  || — || August 26, 2000 || Socorro || LINEAR || — || align=right | 2.8 km || 
|-id=120 bgcolor=#fefefe
| 182120 ||  || — || August 26, 2000 || Socorro || LINEAR || — || align=right | 1.5 km || 
|-id=121 bgcolor=#C2FFFF
| 182121 ||  || — || August 31, 2000 || Socorro || LINEAR || L5 || align=right | 13 km || 
|-id=122 bgcolor=#d6d6d6
| 182122 Sepan ||  ||  || August 26, 2000 || Cerro Tololo || M. W. Buie || — || align=right | 2.9 km || 
|-id=123 bgcolor=#E9E9E9
| 182123 ||  || — || September 1, 2000 || Socorro || LINEAR || — || align=right | 4.0 km || 
|-id=124 bgcolor=#d6d6d6
| 182124 ||  || — || September 1, 2000 || Socorro || LINEAR || — || align=right | 5.3 km || 
|-id=125 bgcolor=#d6d6d6
| 182125 ||  || — || September 1, 2000 || Socorro || LINEAR || EOS || align=right | 3.5 km || 
|-id=126 bgcolor=#E9E9E9
| 182126 ||  || — || September 5, 2000 || Kvistaberg || UDAS || — || align=right | 3.4 km || 
|-id=127 bgcolor=#FA8072
| 182127 ||  || — || September 2, 2000 || Socorro || LINEAR || — || align=right | 2.4 km || 
|-id=128 bgcolor=#d6d6d6
| 182128 ||  || — || September 2, 2000 || Socorro || LINEAR || TIR || align=right | 5.2 km || 
|-id=129 bgcolor=#d6d6d6
| 182129 ||  || — || September 5, 2000 || Anderson Mesa || LONEOS || EUP || align=right | 7.4 km || 
|-id=130 bgcolor=#d6d6d6
| 182130 ||  || — || September 23, 2000 || Socorro || LINEAR || EOS || align=right | 3.3 km || 
|-id=131 bgcolor=#d6d6d6
| 182131 ||  || — || September 23, 2000 || Socorro || LINEAR || — || align=right | 4.3 km || 
|-id=132 bgcolor=#d6d6d6
| 182132 ||  || — || September 23, 2000 || Socorro || LINEAR || — || align=right | 5.2 km || 
|-id=133 bgcolor=#E9E9E9
| 182133 ||  || — || September 26, 2000 || Tebbutt || F. B. Zoltowski || GEF || align=right | 2.2 km || 
|-id=134 bgcolor=#E9E9E9
| 182134 ||  || — || September 23, 2000 || Socorro || LINEAR || — || align=right | 4.1 km || 
|-id=135 bgcolor=#fefefe
| 182135 ||  || — || September 23, 2000 || Socorro || LINEAR || FLO || align=right | 1.1 km || 
|-id=136 bgcolor=#E9E9E9
| 182136 ||  || — || September 24, 2000 || Socorro || LINEAR || — || align=right | 3.4 km || 
|-id=137 bgcolor=#E9E9E9
| 182137 ||  || — || September 24, 2000 || Socorro || LINEAR || — || align=right | 3.9 km || 
|-id=138 bgcolor=#E9E9E9
| 182138 ||  || — || September 24, 2000 || Socorro || LINEAR || MRX || align=right | 1.9 km || 
|-id=139 bgcolor=#E9E9E9
| 182139 ||  || — || September 24, 2000 || Socorro || LINEAR || MRX || align=right | 1.6 km || 
|-id=140 bgcolor=#d6d6d6
| 182140 ||  || — || September 25, 2000 || Črni Vrh || Črni Vrh || — || align=right | 4.4 km || 
|-id=141 bgcolor=#E9E9E9
| 182141 ||  || — || September 23, 2000 || Socorro || LINEAR || GAL || align=right | 2.4 km || 
|-id=142 bgcolor=#d6d6d6
| 182142 ||  || — || September 27, 2000 || Socorro || LINEAR || EUP || align=right | 8.4 km || 
|-id=143 bgcolor=#E9E9E9
| 182143 ||  || — || September 22, 2000 || Socorro || LINEAR || — || align=right | 4.6 km || 
|-id=144 bgcolor=#E9E9E9
| 182144 ||  || — || September 23, 2000 || Socorro || LINEAR || EUN || align=right | 2.4 km || 
|-id=145 bgcolor=#d6d6d6
| 182145 ||  || — || September 23, 2000 || Socorro || LINEAR || — || align=right | 3.2 km || 
|-id=146 bgcolor=#E9E9E9
| 182146 ||  || — || September 24, 2000 || Socorro || LINEAR || — || align=right | 3.9 km || 
|-id=147 bgcolor=#E9E9E9
| 182147 ||  || — || September 24, 2000 || Socorro || LINEAR || — || align=right | 3.9 km || 
|-id=148 bgcolor=#d6d6d6
| 182148 ||  || — || September 24, 2000 || Socorro || LINEAR || — || align=right | 4.4 km || 
|-id=149 bgcolor=#E9E9E9
| 182149 ||  || — || September 24, 2000 || Socorro || LINEAR || — || align=right | 4.2 km || 
|-id=150 bgcolor=#E9E9E9
| 182150 ||  || — || September 24, 2000 || Socorro || LINEAR || GEF || align=right | 2.1 km || 
|-id=151 bgcolor=#d6d6d6
| 182151 ||  || — || September 24, 2000 || Socorro || LINEAR || — || align=right | 4.0 km || 
|-id=152 bgcolor=#E9E9E9
| 182152 ||  || — || September 24, 2000 || Socorro || LINEAR || — || align=right | 3.0 km || 
|-id=153 bgcolor=#d6d6d6
| 182153 ||  || — || September 24, 2000 || Socorro || LINEAR || — || align=right | 3.2 km || 
|-id=154 bgcolor=#E9E9E9
| 182154 ||  || — || September 24, 2000 || Socorro || LINEAR || — || align=right | 3.6 km || 
|-id=155 bgcolor=#d6d6d6
| 182155 ||  || — || September 24, 2000 || Socorro || LINEAR || EMA || align=right | 6.1 km || 
|-id=156 bgcolor=#E9E9E9
| 182156 ||  || — || September 24, 2000 || Socorro || LINEAR || DOR || align=right | 4.2 km || 
|-id=157 bgcolor=#E9E9E9
| 182157 ||  || — || September 24, 2000 || Socorro || LINEAR || — || align=right | 3.5 km || 
|-id=158 bgcolor=#d6d6d6
| 182158 ||  || — || September 24, 2000 || Socorro || LINEAR || TIR || align=right | 5.2 km || 
|-id=159 bgcolor=#E9E9E9
| 182159 ||  || — || September 23, 2000 || Socorro || LINEAR || — || align=right | 4.8 km || 
|-id=160 bgcolor=#d6d6d6
| 182160 ||  || — || September 27, 2000 || Socorro || LINEAR || — || align=right | 3.4 km || 
|-id=161 bgcolor=#C2FFFF
| 182161 ||  || — || September 20, 2000 || Haleakala || NEAT || L5 || align=right | 16 km || 
|-id=162 bgcolor=#E9E9E9
| 182162 ||  || — || September 21, 2000 || Haleakala || NEAT || GAL || align=right | 3.2 km || 
|-id=163 bgcolor=#C2FFFF
| 182163 ||  || — || September 24, 2000 || Socorro || LINEAR || L5 || align=right | 17 km || 
|-id=164 bgcolor=#d6d6d6
| 182164 ||  || — || September 24, 2000 || Socorro || LINEAR || CHA || align=right | 2.3 km || 
|-id=165 bgcolor=#E9E9E9
| 182165 ||  || — || September 24, 2000 || Socorro || LINEAR || — || align=right | 3.5 km || 
|-id=166 bgcolor=#d6d6d6
| 182166 ||  || — || September 24, 2000 || Socorro || LINEAR || — || align=right | 3.7 km || 
|-id=167 bgcolor=#d6d6d6
| 182167 ||  || — || September 26, 2000 || Socorro || LINEAR || EOS || align=right | 2.5 km || 
|-id=168 bgcolor=#d6d6d6
| 182168 ||  || — || September 26, 2000 || Socorro || LINEAR || — || align=right | 5.0 km || 
|-id=169 bgcolor=#E9E9E9
| 182169 ||  || — || September 26, 2000 || Socorro || LINEAR || GEF || align=right | 2.4 km || 
|-id=170 bgcolor=#E9E9E9
| 182170 ||  || — || September 27, 2000 || Socorro || LINEAR || — || align=right | 3.8 km || 
|-id=171 bgcolor=#d6d6d6
| 182171 ||  || — || September 27, 2000 || Socorro || LINEAR || — || align=right | 3.6 km || 
|-id=172 bgcolor=#E9E9E9
| 182172 ||  || — || September 28, 2000 || Socorro || LINEAR || AGN || align=right | 1.9 km || 
|-id=173 bgcolor=#d6d6d6
| 182173 ||  || — || September 28, 2000 || Socorro || LINEAR || NAE || align=right | 5.5 km || 
|-id=174 bgcolor=#E9E9E9
| 182174 ||  || — || September 24, 2000 || Socorro || LINEAR || — || align=right | 2.4 km || 
|-id=175 bgcolor=#d6d6d6
| 182175 ||  || — || September 24, 2000 || Socorro || LINEAR || EOS || align=right | 6.2 km || 
|-id=176 bgcolor=#C2FFFF
| 182176 ||  || — || September 24, 2000 || Socorro || LINEAR || L5 || align=right | 18 km || 
|-id=177 bgcolor=#E9E9E9
| 182177 ||  || — || September 24, 2000 || Socorro || LINEAR || — || align=right | 3.2 km || 
|-id=178 bgcolor=#C2FFFF
| 182178 ||  || — || September 23, 2000 || Socorro || LINEAR || L5 || align=right | 15 km || 
|-id=179 bgcolor=#E9E9E9
| 182179 ||  || — || September 27, 2000 || Socorro || LINEAR || — || align=right | 4.1 km || 
|-id=180 bgcolor=#d6d6d6
| 182180 ||  || — || September 27, 2000 || Socorro || LINEAR || — || align=right | 4.2 km || 
|-id=181 bgcolor=#d6d6d6
| 182181 ||  || — || September 26, 2000 || Socorro || LINEAR || — || align=right | 6.2 km || 
|-id=182 bgcolor=#E9E9E9
| 182182 ||  || — || September 29, 2000 || Haleakala || NEAT || JUN || align=right | 3.1 km || 
|-id=183 bgcolor=#d6d6d6
| 182183 ||  || — || September 28, 2000 || Kitt Peak || Spacewatch || 628 || align=right | 2.1 km || 
|-id=184 bgcolor=#d6d6d6
| 182184 ||  || — || September 29, 2000 || Kitt Peak || Spacewatch || HYG || align=right | 3.4 km || 
|-id=185 bgcolor=#d6d6d6
| 182185 ||  || — || September 23, 2000 || Socorro || LINEAR || — || align=right | 4.5 km || 
|-id=186 bgcolor=#d6d6d6
| 182186 ||  || — || September 29, 2000 || Anderson Mesa || LONEOS || — || align=right | 5.3 km || 
|-id=187 bgcolor=#fefefe
| 182187 ||  || — || September 20, 2000 || Socorro || LINEAR || — || align=right | 1.5 km || 
|-id=188 bgcolor=#d6d6d6
| 182188 ||  || — || October 1, 2000 || Socorro || LINEAR || — || align=right | 4.8 km || 
|-id=189 bgcolor=#d6d6d6
| 182189 ||  || — || October 6, 2000 || Anderson Mesa || LONEOS || — || align=right | 3.4 km || 
|-id=190 bgcolor=#fefefe
| 182190 ||  || — || October 6, 2000 || Anderson Mesa || LONEOS || — || align=right data-sort-value="0.98" | 980 m || 
|-id=191 bgcolor=#d6d6d6
| 182191 ||  || — || October 27, 2000 || Kitt Peak || Spacewatch || — || align=right | 5.5 km || 
|-id=192 bgcolor=#d6d6d6
| 182192 ||  || — || October 27, 2000 || Kitt Peak || Spacewatch || — || align=right | 3.9 km || 
|-id=193 bgcolor=#d6d6d6
| 182193 ||  || — || October 24, 2000 || Socorro || LINEAR || — || align=right | 4.2 km || 
|-id=194 bgcolor=#d6d6d6
| 182194 ||  || — || October 24, 2000 || Socorro || LINEAR || — || align=right | 4.5 km || 
|-id=195 bgcolor=#d6d6d6
| 182195 ||  || — || October 24, 2000 || Socorro || LINEAR || — || align=right | 4.9 km || 
|-id=196 bgcolor=#d6d6d6
| 182196 ||  || — || October 24, 2000 || Socorro || LINEAR || — || align=right | 5.5 km || 
|-id=197 bgcolor=#d6d6d6
| 182197 ||  || — || October 25, 2000 || Socorro || LINEAR || EOS || align=right | 3.2 km || 
|-id=198 bgcolor=#d6d6d6
| 182198 ||  || — || October 29, 2000 || Socorro || LINEAR || — || align=right | 3.3 km || 
|-id=199 bgcolor=#d6d6d6
| 182199 ||  || — || October 31, 2000 || Socorro || LINEAR || — || align=right | 2.9 km || 
|-id=200 bgcolor=#d6d6d6
| 182200 ||  || — || October 26, 2000 || Kitt Peak || Spacewatch || — || align=right | 4.0 km || 
|}

182201–182300 

|-bgcolor=#d6d6d6
| 182201 ||  || — || November 1, 2000 || Socorro || LINEAR || HYG || align=right | 4.7 km || 
|-id=202 bgcolor=#d6d6d6
| 182202 ||  || — || November 1, 2000 || Socorro || LINEAR || — || align=right | 3.2 km || 
|-id=203 bgcolor=#d6d6d6
| 182203 ||  || — || November 1, 2000 || Kitt Peak || Spacewatch || THM || align=right | 3.5 km || 
|-id=204 bgcolor=#d6d6d6
| 182204 ||  || — || November 25, 2000 || Kitt Peak || Spacewatch || SHU3:2 || align=right | 8.8 km || 
|-id=205 bgcolor=#E9E9E9
| 182205 ||  || — || November 24, 2000 || Bohyunsan || Y.-B. Jeon, B.-C. Lee || AGN || align=right | 2.0 km || 
|-id=206 bgcolor=#d6d6d6
| 182206 ||  || — || November 21, 2000 || Socorro || LINEAR || — || align=right | 5.2 km || 
|-id=207 bgcolor=#fefefe
| 182207 ||  || — || November 21, 2000 || Socorro || LINEAR || FLO || align=right | 1.00 km || 
|-id=208 bgcolor=#d6d6d6
| 182208 ||  || — || November 21, 2000 || Socorro || LINEAR || — || align=right | 6.1 km || 
|-id=209 bgcolor=#d6d6d6
| 182209 ||  || — || November 19, 2000 || Socorro || LINEAR || — || align=right | 5.9 km || 
|-id=210 bgcolor=#d6d6d6
| 182210 ||  || — || November 20, 2000 || Socorro || LINEAR || — || align=right | 4.8 km || 
|-id=211 bgcolor=#d6d6d6
| 182211 ||  || — || November 26, 2000 || Socorro || LINEAR || — || align=right | 5.9 km || 
|-id=212 bgcolor=#d6d6d6
| 182212 ||  || — || November 29, 2000 || Socorro || LINEAR || HYG || align=right | 5.1 km || 
|-id=213 bgcolor=#fefefe
| 182213 ||  || — || November 29, 2000 || Socorro || LINEAR || NYS || align=right | 1.2 km || 
|-id=214 bgcolor=#d6d6d6
| 182214 ||  || — || November 17, 2000 || Kitt Peak || Spacewatch || — || align=right | 3.6 km || 
|-id=215 bgcolor=#d6d6d6
| 182215 ||  || — || November 22, 2000 || Haleakala || NEAT || — || align=right | 5.6 km || 
|-id=216 bgcolor=#d6d6d6
| 182216 ||  || — || November 21, 2000 || Socorro || LINEAR || EOS || align=right | 3.6 km || 
|-id=217 bgcolor=#d6d6d6
| 182217 ||  || — || November 21, 2000 || Socorro || LINEAR || — || align=right | 3.1 km || 
|-id=218 bgcolor=#d6d6d6
| 182218 ||  || — || November 29, 2000 || Socorro || LINEAR || — || align=right | 4.6 km || 
|-id=219 bgcolor=#fefefe
| 182219 ||  || — || December 4, 2000 || Socorro || LINEAR || — || align=right | 1.2 km || 
|-id=220 bgcolor=#d6d6d6
| 182220 ||  || — || December 4, 2000 || Socorro || LINEAR || — || align=right | 3.0 km || 
|-id=221 bgcolor=#d6d6d6
| 182221 ||  || — || December 4, 2000 || Socorro || LINEAR || — || align=right | 7.3 km || 
|-id=222 bgcolor=#C2E0FF
| 182222 ||  || — || December 16, 2000 || Kitt Peak || M. J. Holman, B. Gladman, T. Grav || cubewano (hot) || align=right | 168 km || 
|-id=223 bgcolor=#C2E0FF
| 182223 ||  || — || December 17, 2000 || Kitt Peak || M. J. Holman, B. Gladman, T. Grav || SDOcritical || align=right | 136 km || 
|-id=224 bgcolor=#d6d6d6
| 182224 ||  || — || December 22, 2000 || Socorro || LINEAR || HYG || align=right | 4.2 km || 
|-id=225 bgcolor=#d6d6d6
| 182225 ||  || — || December 30, 2000 || Socorro || LINEAR || EUP || align=right | 8.6 km || 
|-id=226 bgcolor=#d6d6d6
| 182226 ||  || — || December 29, 2000 || Haleakala || NEAT || — || align=right | 4.9 km || 
|-id=227 bgcolor=#fefefe
| 182227 ||  || — || December 30, 2000 || Socorro || LINEAR || — || align=right | 1.3 km || 
|-id=228 bgcolor=#d6d6d6
| 182228 ||  || — || December 30, 2000 || Socorro || LINEAR || THM || align=right | 3.8 km || 
|-id=229 bgcolor=#d6d6d6
| 182229 ||  || — || December 29, 2000 || Anderson Mesa || LONEOS || ALA || align=right | 6.7 km || 
|-id=230 bgcolor=#fefefe
| 182230 ||  || — || February 1, 2001 || Socorro || LINEAR || FLO || align=right | 1.1 km || 
|-id=231 bgcolor=#FA8072
| 182231 ||  || — || February 2, 2001 || Anderson Mesa || LONEOS || — || align=right | 1.0 km || 
|-id=232 bgcolor=#fefefe
| 182232 ||  || — || February 16, 2001 || Socorro || LINEAR || — || align=right | 1.6 km || 
|-id=233 bgcolor=#fefefe
| 182233 ||  || — || February 16, 2001 || Socorro || LINEAR || — || align=right | 1.2 km || 
|-id=234 bgcolor=#fefefe
| 182234 ||  || — || February 16, 2001 || Oaxaca || J. M. Roe || — || align=right | 1.2 km || 
|-id=235 bgcolor=#fefefe
| 182235 ||  || — || February 17, 2001 || Črni Vrh || Črni Vrh || — || align=right | 1.3 km || 
|-id=236 bgcolor=#fefefe
| 182236 ||  || — || February 16, 2001 || Socorro || LINEAR || FLO || align=right data-sort-value="0.93" | 930 m || 
|-id=237 bgcolor=#fefefe
| 182237 ||  || — || February 17, 2001 || Socorro || LINEAR || — || align=right | 1.4 km || 
|-id=238 bgcolor=#fefefe
| 182238 ||  || — || February 19, 2001 || Socorro || LINEAR || FLO || align=right | 1.2 km || 
|-id=239 bgcolor=#d6d6d6
| 182239 ||  || — || February 22, 2001 || Kitt Peak || Spacewatch || 3:2 || align=right | 7.2 km || 
|-id=240 bgcolor=#fefefe
| 182240 ||  || — || February 19, 2001 || Socorro || LINEAR || — || align=right data-sort-value="0.82" | 820 m || 
|-id=241 bgcolor=#fefefe
| 182241 ||  || — || March 15, 2001 || Socorro || LINEAR || — || align=right | 1.4 km || 
|-id=242 bgcolor=#fefefe
| 182242 ||  || — || March 15, 2001 || Anderson Mesa || LONEOS || — || align=right | 1.4 km || 
|-id=243 bgcolor=#fefefe
| 182243 ||  || — || March 20, 2001 || Eskridge || G. Hug || — || align=right | 1.6 km || 
|-id=244 bgcolor=#fefefe
| 182244 ||  || — || March 19, 2001 || Anderson Mesa || LONEOS || — || align=right | 1.6 km || 
|-id=245 bgcolor=#fefefe
| 182245 ||  || — || March 19, 2001 || Anderson Mesa || LONEOS || ERI || align=right | 2.4 km || 
|-id=246 bgcolor=#fefefe
| 182246 ||  || — || March 18, 2001 || Socorro || LINEAR || — || align=right | 1.3 km || 
|-id=247 bgcolor=#fefefe
| 182247 ||  || — || March 18, 2001 || Socorro || LINEAR || NYS || align=right data-sort-value="0.96" | 960 m || 
|-id=248 bgcolor=#fefefe
| 182248 ||  || — || March 19, 2001 || Socorro || LINEAR || — || align=right | 1.2 km || 
|-id=249 bgcolor=#fefefe
| 182249 ||  || — || March 19, 2001 || Socorro || LINEAR || FLO || align=right | 1.0 km || 
|-id=250 bgcolor=#fefefe
| 182250 ||  || — || March 23, 2001 || Socorro || LINEAR || — || align=right | 1.2 km || 
|-id=251 bgcolor=#fefefe
| 182251 ||  || — || March 16, 2001 || Socorro || LINEAR || — || align=right | 1.6 km || 
|-id=252 bgcolor=#fefefe
| 182252 ||  || — || March 16, 2001 || Socorro || LINEAR || — || align=right | 1.4 km || 
|-id=253 bgcolor=#fefefe
| 182253 ||  || — || March 18, 2001 || Socorro || LINEAR || FLO || align=right | 1.1 km || 
|-id=254 bgcolor=#fefefe
| 182254 ||  || — || March 18, 2001 || Socorro || LINEAR || FLO || align=right data-sort-value="0.93" | 930 m || 
|-id=255 bgcolor=#fefefe
| 182255 ||  || — || March 18, 2001 || Socorro || LINEAR || — || align=right | 1.3 km || 
|-id=256 bgcolor=#fefefe
| 182256 ||  || — || March 24, 2001 || Kitt Peak || Spacewatch || FLO || align=right data-sort-value="0.97" | 970 m || 
|-id=257 bgcolor=#fefefe
| 182257 ||  || — || March 24, 2001 || Anderson Mesa || LONEOS || — || align=right | 1.5 km || 
|-id=258 bgcolor=#fefefe
| 182258 ||  || — || March 23, 2001 || Anderson Mesa || LONEOS || FLO || align=right | 1.1 km || 
|-id=259 bgcolor=#fefefe
| 182259 ||  || — || March 16, 2001 || Socorro || LINEAR || FLO || align=right data-sort-value="0.96" | 960 m || 
|-id=260 bgcolor=#FA8072
| 182260 ||  || — || April 14, 2001 || Socorro || LINEAR || PHO || align=right | 1.5 km || 
|-id=261 bgcolor=#fefefe
| 182261 ||  || — || April 15, 2001 || Socorro || LINEAR || ERI || align=right | 2.7 km || 
|-id=262 bgcolor=#fefefe
| 182262 Solène || 2001 HA ||  || April 17, 2001 || Saint-Véran || Saint-Véran Obs. || NYS || align=right data-sort-value="0.92" | 920 m || 
|-id=263 bgcolor=#FA8072
| 182263 ||  || — || April 21, 2001 || Socorro || LINEAR || — || align=right | 1.5 km || 
|-id=264 bgcolor=#fefefe
| 182264 ||  || — || April 17, 2001 || Socorro || LINEAR || — || align=right | 2.9 km || 
|-id=265 bgcolor=#fefefe
| 182265 ||  || — || April 26, 2001 || Kitt Peak || Spacewatch || — || align=right | 1.2 km || 
|-id=266 bgcolor=#fefefe
| 182266 ||  || — || April 26, 2001 || Kitt Peak || Spacewatch || ERI || align=right | 2.7 km || 
|-id=267 bgcolor=#fefefe
| 182267 ||  || — || April 27, 2001 || Kitt Peak || Spacewatch || PHO || align=right | 1.4 km || 
|-id=268 bgcolor=#E9E9E9
| 182268 ||  || — || April 27, 2001 || Kitt Peak || Spacewatch || — || align=right | 3.5 km || 
|-id=269 bgcolor=#fefefe
| 182269 ||  || — || April 27, 2001 || Socorro || LINEAR || — || align=right | 1.4 km || 
|-id=270 bgcolor=#fefefe
| 182270 ||  || — || April 16, 2001 || Socorro || LINEAR || — || align=right | 1.1 km || 
|-id=271 bgcolor=#fefefe
| 182271 ||  || — || April 24, 2001 || Kitt Peak || Spacewatch || MAS || align=right | 1.2 km || 
|-id=272 bgcolor=#fefefe
| 182272 ||  || — || April 23, 2001 || Socorro || LINEAR || V || align=right | 1.0 km || 
|-id=273 bgcolor=#fefefe
| 182273 || 2001 KA || — || May 16, 2001 || Nogales || Tenagra II Obs. || V || align=right | 1.1 km || 
|-id=274 bgcolor=#FA8072
| 182274 ||  || — || May 18, 2001 || Socorro || LINEAR || — || align=right | 6.9 km || 
|-id=275 bgcolor=#E9E9E9
| 182275 ||  || — || May 18, 2001 || Socorro || LINEAR || — || align=right | 1.8 km || 
|-id=276 bgcolor=#fefefe
| 182276 ||  || — || May 18, 2001 || Socorro || LINEAR || FLO || align=right | 1.2 km || 
|-id=277 bgcolor=#fefefe
| 182277 ||  || — || May 18, 2001 || Socorro || LINEAR || — || align=right | 1.2 km || 
|-id=278 bgcolor=#fefefe
| 182278 ||  || — || May 20, 2001 || Ondřejov || P. Kušnirák, P. Pravec || — || align=right | 2.4 km || 
|-id=279 bgcolor=#fefefe
| 182279 ||  || — || May 17, 2001 || Socorro || LINEAR || MAS || align=right | 1.2 km || 
|-id=280 bgcolor=#fefefe
| 182280 ||  || — || May 17, 2001 || Socorro || LINEAR || ERI || align=right | 3.3 km || 
|-id=281 bgcolor=#fefefe
| 182281 ||  || — || May 17, 2001 || Socorro || LINEAR || — || align=right | 1.5 km || 
|-id=282 bgcolor=#fefefe
| 182282 ||  || — || May 17, 2001 || Socorro || LINEAR || — || align=right | 1.1 km || 
|-id=283 bgcolor=#fefefe
| 182283 ||  || — || May 17, 2001 || Socorro || LINEAR || NYS || align=right | 1.0 km || 
|-id=284 bgcolor=#fefefe
| 182284 ||  || — || May 18, 2001 || Socorro || LINEAR || ERI || align=right | 3.0 km || 
|-id=285 bgcolor=#fefefe
| 182285 ||  || — || May 18, 2001 || Socorro || LINEAR || — || align=right | 1.4 km || 
|-id=286 bgcolor=#fefefe
| 182286 ||  || — || May 24, 2001 || Socorro || LINEAR || NYS || align=right | 1.3 km || 
|-id=287 bgcolor=#fefefe
| 182287 ||  || — || May 17, 2001 || Socorro || LINEAR || — || align=right | 2.7 km || 
|-id=288 bgcolor=#fefefe
| 182288 ||  || — || May 26, 2001 || Socorro || LINEAR || — || align=right | 1.3 km || 
|-id=289 bgcolor=#E9E9E9
| 182289 ||  || — || May 26, 2001 || Socorro || LINEAR || — || align=right | 2.9 km || 
|-id=290 bgcolor=#fefefe
| 182290 ||  || — || May 20, 2001 || Haleakala || NEAT || — || align=right | 1.3 km || 
|-id=291 bgcolor=#fefefe
| 182291 ||  || — || May 24, 2001 || Socorro || LINEAR || MAS || align=right | 1.3 km || 
|-id=292 bgcolor=#fefefe
| 182292 ||  || — || May 25, 2001 || Kitt Peak || Spacewatch || FLO || align=right data-sort-value="0.89" | 890 m || 
|-id=293 bgcolor=#fefefe
| 182293 ||  || — || May 31, 2001 || Palomar || NEAT || — || align=right | 1.4 km || 
|-id=294 bgcolor=#C2E0FF
| 182294 ||  || — || May 24, 2001 || Cerro Tololo || M. W. Buie || res6:11critical || align=right | 212 km || 
|-id=295 bgcolor=#fefefe
| 182295 ||  || — || June 15, 2001 || Socorro || LINEAR || — || align=right | 1.6 km || 
|-id=296 bgcolor=#E9E9E9
| 182296 ||  || — || June 21, 2001 || Palomar || NEAT || — || align=right | 2.0 km || 
|-id=297 bgcolor=#E9E9E9
| 182297 ||  || — || June 28, 2001 || Anderson Mesa || LONEOS || RAF || align=right | 1.9 km || 
|-id=298 bgcolor=#fefefe
| 182298 ||  || — || June 25, 2001 || Palomar || NEAT || V || align=right | 1.3 km || 
|-id=299 bgcolor=#fefefe
| 182299 ||  || — || July 12, 2001 || Palomar || NEAT || MAS || align=right | 1.2 km || 
|-id=300 bgcolor=#fefefe
| 182300 ||  || — || July 13, 2001 || Palomar || NEAT || — || align=right | 1.1 km || 
|}

182301–182400 

|-bgcolor=#E9E9E9
| 182301 ||  || — || July 14, 2001 || Haleakala || NEAT || — || align=right | 7.4 km || 
|-id=302 bgcolor=#E9E9E9
| 182302 ||  || — || July 14, 2001 || Palomar || NEAT || — || align=right | 1.8 km || 
|-id=303 bgcolor=#fefefe
| 182303 ||  || — || July 14, 2001 || Palomar || NEAT || MAS || align=right | 1.0 km || 
|-id=304 bgcolor=#d6d6d6
| 182304 ||  || — || July 17, 2001 || Anderson Mesa || LONEOS || — || align=right | 5.5 km || 
|-id=305 bgcolor=#E9E9E9
| 182305 ||  || — || July 17, 2001 || Anderson Mesa || LONEOS || — || align=right | 2.2 km || 
|-id=306 bgcolor=#E9E9E9
| 182306 ||  || — || July 18, 2001 || Haleakala || NEAT || — || align=right | 1.6 km || 
|-id=307 bgcolor=#fefefe
| 182307 ||  || — || July 21, 2001 || Palomar || NEAT || H || align=right data-sort-value="0.95" | 950 m || 
|-id=308 bgcolor=#fefefe
| 182308 ||  || — || July 21, 2001 || Haleakala || NEAT || V || align=right data-sort-value="0.99" | 990 m || 
|-id=309 bgcolor=#E9E9E9
| 182309 ||  || — || July 22, 2001 || Palomar || NEAT || — || align=right | 1.9 km || 
|-id=310 bgcolor=#fefefe
| 182310 ||  || — || July 22, 2001 || Palomar || NEAT || H || align=right data-sort-value="0.98" | 980 m || 
|-id=311 bgcolor=#E9E9E9
| 182311 ||  || — || July 22, 2001 || Palomar || NEAT || EUN || align=right | 2.0 km || 
|-id=312 bgcolor=#fefefe
| 182312 ||  || — || July 21, 2001 || Haleakala || NEAT || NYS || align=right | 1.2 km || 
|-id=313 bgcolor=#E9E9E9
| 182313 ||  || — || July 21, 2001 || Haleakala || NEAT || — || align=right | 1.8 km || 
|-id=314 bgcolor=#fefefe
| 182314 ||  || — || July 25, 2001 || Palomar || NEAT || H || align=right data-sort-value="0.73" | 730 m || 
|-id=315 bgcolor=#fefefe
| 182315 ||  || — || July 22, 2001 || Palomar || NEAT || — || align=right | 5.1 km || 
|-id=316 bgcolor=#E9E9E9
| 182316 ||  || — || July 28, 2001 || Haleakala || NEAT || — || align=right | 1.5 km || 
|-id=317 bgcolor=#E9E9E9
| 182317 ||  || — || July 21, 2001 || Haleakala || NEAT || — || align=right | 1.3 km || 
|-id=318 bgcolor=#fefefe
| 182318 ||  || — || July 25, 2001 || Haleakala || NEAT || V || align=right | 1.4 km || 
|-id=319 bgcolor=#fefefe
| 182319 ||  || — || July 25, 2001 || Haleakala || NEAT || — || align=right | 1.4 km || 
|-id=320 bgcolor=#fefefe
| 182320 ||  || — || July 27, 2001 || Anderson Mesa || LONEOS || NYS || align=right | 1.0 km || 
|-id=321 bgcolor=#fefefe
| 182321 ||  || — || July 30, 2001 || Socorro || LINEAR || NYS || align=right | 1.0 km || 
|-id=322 bgcolor=#E9E9E9
| 182322 ||  || — || July 27, 2001 || Anderson Mesa || LONEOS || — || align=right | 3.4 km || 
|-id=323 bgcolor=#E9E9E9
| 182323 ||  || — || July 28, 2001 || Anderson Mesa || LONEOS || — || align=right | 5.2 km || 
|-id=324 bgcolor=#fefefe
| 182324 ||  || — || August 10, 2001 || Palomar || NEAT || — || align=right | 2.4 km || 
|-id=325 bgcolor=#E9E9E9
| 182325 ||  || — || August 9, 2001 || Palomar || NEAT || — || align=right | 1.6 km || 
|-id=326 bgcolor=#fefefe
| 182326 ||  || — || August 10, 2001 || Palomar || NEAT || — || align=right | 1.4 km || 
|-id=327 bgcolor=#fefefe
| 182327 ||  || — || August 9, 2001 || Palomar || NEAT || ERI || align=right | 2.6 km || 
|-id=328 bgcolor=#FA8072
| 182328 ||  || — || August 9, 2001 || Palomar || NEAT || — || align=right | 1.1 km || 
|-id=329 bgcolor=#E9E9E9
| 182329 ||  || — || August 8, 2001 || Haleakala || NEAT || — || align=right | 2.6 km || 
|-id=330 bgcolor=#fefefe
| 182330 ||  || — || August 9, 2001 || Palomar || NEAT || — || align=right | 2.0 km || 
|-id=331 bgcolor=#fefefe
| 182331 ||  || — || August 10, 2001 || Palomar || NEAT || V || align=right | 1.3 km || 
|-id=332 bgcolor=#E9E9E9
| 182332 ||  || — || August 11, 2001 || Haleakala || NEAT || — || align=right | 1.8 km || 
|-id=333 bgcolor=#fefefe
| 182333 ||  || — || August 11, 2001 || Palomar || NEAT || — || align=right | 1.7 km || 
|-id=334 bgcolor=#E9E9E9
| 182334 ||  || — || August 12, 2001 || Haleakala || NEAT || — || align=right | 1.4 km || 
|-id=335 bgcolor=#fefefe
| 182335 ||  || — || August 15, 2001 || Haleakala || NEAT || NYS || align=right | 1.3 km || 
|-id=336 bgcolor=#E9E9E9
| 182336 ||  || — || August 15, 2001 || Haleakala || NEAT || — || align=right | 1.9 km || 
|-id=337 bgcolor=#E9E9E9
| 182337 ||  || — || August 14, 2001 || Palomar || NEAT || — || align=right | 5.0 km || 
|-id=338 bgcolor=#fefefe
| 182338 ||  || — || August 11, 2001 || Haleakala || NEAT || — || align=right | 1.4 km || 
|-id=339 bgcolor=#E9E9E9
| 182339 ||  || — || August 12, 2001 || Palomar || NEAT || HNS || align=right | 1.6 km || 
|-id=340 bgcolor=#E9E9E9
| 182340 ||  || — || August 16, 2001 || Socorro || LINEAR || — || align=right | 3.1 km || 
|-id=341 bgcolor=#E9E9E9
| 182341 ||  || — || August 16, 2001 || Socorro || LINEAR || — || align=right | 2.0 km || 
|-id=342 bgcolor=#E9E9E9
| 182342 ||  || — || August 16, 2001 || Socorro || LINEAR || RAF || align=right | 1.5 km || 
|-id=343 bgcolor=#E9E9E9
| 182343 ||  || — || August 16, 2001 || Socorro || LINEAR || — || align=right | 3.2 km || 
|-id=344 bgcolor=#E9E9E9
| 182344 ||  || — || August 16, 2001 || Socorro || LINEAR || — || align=right | 1.4 km || 
|-id=345 bgcolor=#E9E9E9
| 182345 ||  || — || August 16, 2001 || Socorro || LINEAR || ADE || align=right | 5.5 km || 
|-id=346 bgcolor=#E9E9E9
| 182346 ||  || — || August 16, 2001 || Socorro || LINEAR || — || align=right | 1.6 km || 
|-id=347 bgcolor=#E9E9E9
| 182347 ||  || — || August 17, 2001 || Needville || Needville Obs. || — || align=right | 2.6 km || 
|-id=348 bgcolor=#fefefe
| 182348 ||  || — || August 16, 2001 || Socorro || LINEAR || — || align=right | 1.2 km || 
|-id=349 bgcolor=#fefefe
| 182349 ||  || — || August 16, 2001 || Socorro || LINEAR || MAS || align=right | 1.1 km || 
|-id=350 bgcolor=#E9E9E9
| 182350 ||  || — || August 16, 2001 || Socorro || LINEAR || — || align=right | 2.7 km || 
|-id=351 bgcolor=#fefefe
| 182351 ||  || — || August 16, 2001 || Socorro || LINEAR || NYS || align=right data-sort-value="0.73" | 730 m || 
|-id=352 bgcolor=#fefefe
| 182352 ||  || — || August 16, 2001 || Socorro || LINEAR || MAS || align=right | 1.0 km || 
|-id=353 bgcolor=#fefefe
| 182353 ||  || — || August 16, 2001 || Socorro || LINEAR || MAS || align=right | 1.1 km || 
|-id=354 bgcolor=#fefefe
| 182354 ||  || — || August 18, 2001 || Socorro || LINEAR || — || align=right | 1.6 km || 
|-id=355 bgcolor=#fefefe
| 182355 ||  || — || August 16, 2001 || Socorro || LINEAR || — || align=right | 1.2 km || 
|-id=356 bgcolor=#E9E9E9
| 182356 ||  || — || August 16, 2001 || Socorro || LINEAR || — || align=right | 2.5 km || 
|-id=357 bgcolor=#fefefe
| 182357 ||  || — || August 17, 2001 || Socorro || LINEAR || — || align=right | 1.5 km || 
|-id=358 bgcolor=#fefefe
| 182358 ||  || — || August 19, 2001 || Socorro || LINEAR || — || align=right | 4.3 km || 
|-id=359 bgcolor=#fefefe
| 182359 ||  || — || August 17, 2001 || Socorro || LINEAR || — || align=right | 2.7 km || 
|-id=360 bgcolor=#E9E9E9
| 182360 ||  || — || August 17, 2001 || Socorro || LINEAR || DOR || align=right | 4.4 km || 
|-id=361 bgcolor=#fefefe
| 182361 ||  || — || August 19, 2001 || Socorro || LINEAR || — || align=right | 1.5 km || 
|-id=362 bgcolor=#fefefe
| 182362 ||  || — || August 19, 2001 || Socorro || LINEAR || — || align=right | 1.4 km || 
|-id=363 bgcolor=#fefefe
| 182363 ||  || — || August 19, 2001 || Socorro || LINEAR || NYS || align=right data-sort-value="0.90" | 900 m || 
|-id=364 bgcolor=#E9E9E9
| 182364 ||  || — || August 19, 2001 || Socorro || LINEAR || — || align=right | 2.3 km || 
|-id=365 bgcolor=#E9E9E9
| 182365 ||  || — || August 20, 2001 || Socorro || LINEAR || — || align=right | 1.9 km || 
|-id=366 bgcolor=#E9E9E9
| 182366 ||  || — || August 22, 2001 || Socorro || LINEAR || ADE || align=right | 5.8 km || 
|-id=367 bgcolor=#E9E9E9
| 182367 ||  || — || August 21, 2001 || Kitt Peak || Spacewatch || DOR || align=right | 3.3 km || 
|-id=368 bgcolor=#E9E9E9
| 182368 ||  || — || August 24, 2001 || Kitt Peak || Spacewatch || — || align=right | 2.2 km || 
|-id=369 bgcolor=#E9E9E9
| 182369 ||  || — || August 23, 2001 || Anderson Mesa || LONEOS || — || align=right | 1.5 km || 
|-id=370 bgcolor=#E9E9E9
| 182370 ||  || — || August 23, 2001 || Anderson Mesa || LONEOS || RAF || align=right | 1.5 km || 
|-id=371 bgcolor=#fefefe
| 182371 ||  || — || August 23, 2001 || Anderson Mesa || LONEOS || NYS || align=right | 1.0 km || 
|-id=372 bgcolor=#fefefe
| 182372 ||  || — || August 25, 2001 || Palomar || NEAT || NYS || align=right | 1.0 km || 
|-id=373 bgcolor=#E9E9E9
| 182373 ||  || — || August 29, 2001 || Palomar || NEAT || — || align=right | 1.8 km || 
|-id=374 bgcolor=#E9E9E9
| 182374 ||  || — || August 23, 2001 || Palomar || NEAT || — || align=right | 1.9 km || 
|-id=375 bgcolor=#E9E9E9
| 182375 ||  || — || August 22, 2001 || Bergisch Gladbach || W. Bickel || — || align=right | 1.7 km || 
|-id=376 bgcolor=#E9E9E9
| 182376 ||  || — || August 22, 2001 || Socorro || LINEAR || — || align=right | 2.1 km || 
|-id=377 bgcolor=#fefefe
| 182377 ||  || — || August 22, 2001 || Kitt Peak || Spacewatch || NYS || align=right data-sort-value="0.98" | 980 m || 
|-id=378 bgcolor=#E9E9E9
| 182378 ||  || — || August 22, 2001 || Socorro || LINEAR || — || align=right | 2.7 km || 
|-id=379 bgcolor=#E9E9E9
| 182379 ||  || — || August 23, 2001 || Anderson Mesa || LONEOS || — || align=right | 1.5 km || 
|-id=380 bgcolor=#E9E9E9
| 182380 ||  || — || August 24, 2001 || Anderson Mesa || LONEOS || — || align=right | 1.7 km || 
|-id=381 bgcolor=#fefefe
| 182381 ||  || — || August 24, 2001 || Kitt Peak || Spacewatch || — || align=right | 1.2 km || 
|-id=382 bgcolor=#E9E9E9
| 182382 ||  || — || August 24, 2001 || Socorro || LINEAR || — || align=right | 1.4 km || 
|-id=383 bgcolor=#E9E9E9
| 182383 ||  || — || August 24, 2001 || Socorro || LINEAR || — || align=right | 2.2 km || 
|-id=384 bgcolor=#E9E9E9
| 182384 ||  || — || August 24, 2001 || Socorro || LINEAR || CLO || align=right | 1.9 km || 
|-id=385 bgcolor=#E9E9E9
| 182385 ||  || — || August 24, 2001 || Socorro || LINEAR || — || align=right | 1.9 km || 
|-id=386 bgcolor=#E9E9E9
| 182386 ||  || — || August 25, 2001 || Socorro || LINEAR || AEO || align=right | 2.4 km || 
|-id=387 bgcolor=#E9E9E9
| 182387 ||  || — || August 25, 2001 || Anderson Mesa || LONEOS || — || align=right | 2.5 km || 
|-id=388 bgcolor=#E9E9E9
| 182388 ||  || — || August 25, 2001 || Socorro || LINEAR || — || align=right | 1.6 km || 
|-id=389 bgcolor=#fefefe
| 182389 ||  || — || August 25, 2001 || Socorro || LINEAR || NYS || align=right | 1.0 km || 
|-id=390 bgcolor=#E9E9E9
| 182390 ||  || — || August 25, 2001 || Socorro || LINEAR || AER || align=right | 2.3 km || 
|-id=391 bgcolor=#fefefe
| 182391 ||  || — || August 20, 2001 || Socorro || LINEAR || — || align=right | 2.2 km || 
|-id=392 bgcolor=#E9E9E9
| 182392 ||  || — || August 20, 2001 || Palomar || NEAT || — || align=right | 2.1 km || 
|-id=393 bgcolor=#E9E9E9
| 182393 ||  || — || August 19, 2001 || Socorro || LINEAR || EUN || align=right | 2.1 km || 
|-id=394 bgcolor=#E9E9E9
| 182394 ||  || — || August 19, 2001 || Socorro || LINEAR || — || align=right | 2.8 km || 
|-id=395 bgcolor=#fefefe
| 182395 ||  || — || August 19, 2001 || Socorro || LINEAR || — || align=right | 1.8 km || 
|-id=396 bgcolor=#E9E9E9
| 182396 ||  || — || August 17, 2001 || Socorro || LINEAR || — || align=right | 1.9 km || 
|-id=397 bgcolor=#C2E0FF
| 182397 ||  || — || August 20, 2001 || Cerro Tololo || M. W. Buie || res4:9critical || align=right | 293 km || 
|-id=398 bgcolor=#E9E9E9
| 182398 ||  || — || August 20, 2001 || Palomar || NEAT || — || align=right | 1.6 km || 
|-id=399 bgcolor=#E9E9E9
| 182399 || 2001 RX || — || September 8, 2001 || Goodricke-Pigott || R. A. Tucker || — || align=right | 1.8 km || 
|-id=400 bgcolor=#E9E9E9
| 182400 ||  || — || September 7, 2001 || Socorro || LINEAR || — || align=right | 2.5 km || 
|}

182401–182500 

|-bgcolor=#d6d6d6
| 182401 ||  || — || September 8, 2001 || Socorro || LINEAR || — || align=right | 3.8 km || 
|-id=402 bgcolor=#E9E9E9
| 182402 ||  || — || September 7, 2001 || Socorro || LINEAR || INO || align=right | 2.3 km || 
|-id=403 bgcolor=#E9E9E9
| 182403 ||  || — || September 7, 2001 || Socorro || LINEAR || — || align=right | 1.6 km || 
|-id=404 bgcolor=#fefefe
| 182404 ||  || — || September 8, 2001 || Socorro || LINEAR || — || align=right | 1.6 km || 
|-id=405 bgcolor=#E9E9E9
| 182405 ||  || — || September 8, 2001 || Socorro || LINEAR || — || align=right | 2.1 km || 
|-id=406 bgcolor=#E9E9E9
| 182406 ||  || — || September 8, 2001 || Socorro || LINEAR || — || align=right | 2.4 km || 
|-id=407 bgcolor=#E9E9E9
| 182407 ||  || — || September 10, 2001 || Desert Eagle || W. K. Y. Yeung || KON || align=right | 3.8 km || 
|-id=408 bgcolor=#E9E9E9
| 182408 ||  || — || September 12, 2001 || Socorro || LINEAR || — || align=right | 1.3 km || 
|-id=409 bgcolor=#E9E9E9
| 182409 ||  || — || September 12, 2001 || Socorro || LINEAR || — || align=right | 2.4 km || 
|-id=410 bgcolor=#E9E9E9
| 182410 ||  || — || September 12, 2001 || Socorro || LINEAR || — || align=right | 3.1 km || 
|-id=411 bgcolor=#E9E9E9
| 182411 ||  || — || September 12, 2001 || Socorro || LINEAR || DOR || align=right | 3.3 km || 
|-id=412 bgcolor=#E9E9E9
| 182412 ||  || — || September 10, 2001 || Socorro || LINEAR || EUN || align=right | 2.1 km || 
|-id=413 bgcolor=#E9E9E9
| 182413 ||  || — || September 10, 2001 || Socorro || LINEAR || — || align=right | 1.7 km || 
|-id=414 bgcolor=#E9E9E9
| 182414 ||  || — || September 10, 2001 || Socorro || LINEAR || — || align=right | 3.1 km || 
|-id=415 bgcolor=#E9E9E9
| 182415 ||  || — || September 10, 2001 || Socorro || LINEAR || EUN || align=right | 2.4 km || 
|-id=416 bgcolor=#E9E9E9
| 182416 ||  || — || September 10, 2001 || Socorro || LINEAR || EUN || align=right | 2.6 km || 
|-id=417 bgcolor=#E9E9E9
| 182417 ||  || — || September 14, 2001 || Palomar || NEAT || — || align=right | 1.4 km || 
|-id=418 bgcolor=#E9E9E9
| 182418 ||  || — || September 11, 2001 || Anderson Mesa || LONEOS || EUN || align=right | 2.1 km || 
|-id=419 bgcolor=#E9E9E9
| 182419 ||  || — || September 12, 2001 || Socorro || LINEAR || — || align=right | 1.3 km || 
|-id=420 bgcolor=#E9E9E9
| 182420 ||  || — || September 12, 2001 || Socorro || LINEAR || CLO || align=right | 1.8 km || 
|-id=421 bgcolor=#d6d6d6
| 182421 ||  || — || September 12, 2001 || Socorro || LINEAR || — || align=right | 5.1 km || 
|-id=422 bgcolor=#E9E9E9
| 182422 ||  || — || September 12, 2001 || Socorro || LINEAR || — || align=right | 1.2 km || 
|-id=423 bgcolor=#d6d6d6
| 182423 ||  || — || September 12, 2001 || Socorro || LINEAR || — || align=right | 4.4 km || 
|-id=424 bgcolor=#d6d6d6
| 182424 ||  || — || September 12, 2001 || Socorro || LINEAR || — || align=right | 4.1 km || 
|-id=425 bgcolor=#E9E9E9
| 182425 ||  || — || September 12, 2001 || Socorro || LINEAR || PAD || align=right | 3.2 km || 
|-id=426 bgcolor=#E9E9E9
| 182426 ||  || — || September 12, 2001 || Socorro || LINEAR || — || align=right | 1.2 km || 
|-id=427 bgcolor=#E9E9E9
| 182427 ||  || — || September 12, 2001 || Socorro || LINEAR || — || align=right | 2.3 km || 
|-id=428 bgcolor=#E9E9E9
| 182428 ||  || — || September 12, 2001 || Socorro || LINEAR || — || align=right | 2.1 km || 
|-id=429 bgcolor=#E9E9E9
| 182429 ||  || — || September 12, 2001 || Socorro || LINEAR || — || align=right | 2.0 km || 
|-id=430 bgcolor=#E9E9E9
| 182430 ||  || — || September 12, 2001 || Socorro || LINEAR || — || align=right | 2.2 km || 
|-id=431 bgcolor=#E9E9E9
| 182431 ||  || — || September 12, 2001 || Socorro || LINEAR || — || align=right | 2.5 km || 
|-id=432 bgcolor=#E9E9E9
| 182432 ||  || — || September 12, 2001 || Socorro || LINEAR || — || align=right | 2.9 km || 
|-id=433 bgcolor=#E9E9E9
| 182433 ||  || — || September 12, 2001 || Socorro || LINEAR || — || align=right | 1.3 km || 
|-id=434 bgcolor=#E9E9E9
| 182434 ||  || — || September 12, 2001 || Socorro || LINEAR || — || align=right | 2.4 km || 
|-id=435 bgcolor=#E9E9E9
| 182435 ||  || — || September 12, 2001 || Socorro || LINEAR || WIT || align=right | 1.4 km || 
|-id=436 bgcolor=#E9E9E9
| 182436 ||  || — || September 17, 2001 || Desert Eagle || W. K. Y. Yeung || — || align=right | 2.1 km || 
|-id=437 bgcolor=#E9E9E9
| 182437 ||  || — || September 16, 2001 || Socorro || LINEAR || — || align=right | 1.7 km || 
|-id=438 bgcolor=#E9E9E9
| 182438 ||  || — || September 16, 2001 || Socorro || LINEAR || — || align=right | 2.0 km || 
|-id=439 bgcolor=#E9E9E9
| 182439 ||  || — || September 16, 2001 || Socorro || LINEAR || — || align=right | 1.6 km || 
|-id=440 bgcolor=#E9E9E9
| 182440 ||  || — || September 16, 2001 || Socorro || LINEAR || — || align=right | 4.2 km || 
|-id=441 bgcolor=#E9E9E9
| 182441 ||  || — || September 16, 2001 || Socorro || LINEAR || — || align=right | 2.3 km || 
|-id=442 bgcolor=#E9E9E9
| 182442 ||  || — || September 16, 2001 || Socorro || LINEAR || GEF || align=right | 3.3 km || 
|-id=443 bgcolor=#fefefe
| 182443 ||  || — || September 16, 2001 || Socorro || LINEAR || NYS || align=right | 1.0 km || 
|-id=444 bgcolor=#E9E9E9
| 182444 ||  || — || September 16, 2001 || Socorro || LINEAR || — || align=right | 2.3 km || 
|-id=445 bgcolor=#C2FFFF
| 182445 ||  || — || September 16, 2001 || Socorro || LINEAR || L5 || align=right | 14 km || 
|-id=446 bgcolor=#E9E9E9
| 182446 ||  || — || September 16, 2001 || Socorro || LINEAR || DOR || align=right | 4.9 km || 
|-id=447 bgcolor=#E9E9E9
| 182447 ||  || — || September 16, 2001 || Socorro || LINEAR || — || align=right | 3.4 km || 
|-id=448 bgcolor=#E9E9E9
| 182448 ||  || — || September 16, 2001 || Socorro || LINEAR || — || align=right | 2.5 km || 
|-id=449 bgcolor=#E9E9E9
| 182449 ||  || — || September 16, 2001 || Socorro || LINEAR || — || align=right | 3.8 km || 
|-id=450 bgcolor=#E9E9E9
| 182450 ||  || — || September 16, 2001 || Socorro || LINEAR || — || align=right | 2.5 km || 
|-id=451 bgcolor=#E9E9E9
| 182451 ||  || — || September 16, 2001 || Socorro || LINEAR || — || align=right | 2.1 km || 
|-id=452 bgcolor=#E9E9E9
| 182452 ||  || — || September 16, 2001 || Socorro || LINEAR || — || align=right | 5.2 km || 
|-id=453 bgcolor=#E9E9E9
| 182453 ||  || — || September 16, 2001 || Socorro || LINEAR || ADE || align=right | 3.1 km || 
|-id=454 bgcolor=#E9E9E9
| 182454 ||  || — || September 17, 2001 || Socorro || LINEAR || — || align=right | 3.2 km || 
|-id=455 bgcolor=#fefefe
| 182455 ||  || — || September 17, 2001 || Socorro || LINEAR || H || align=right | 1.0 km || 
|-id=456 bgcolor=#E9E9E9
| 182456 ||  || — || September 17, 2001 || Socorro || LINEAR || MRX || align=right | 1.6 km || 
|-id=457 bgcolor=#E9E9E9
| 182457 ||  || — || September 17, 2001 || Socorro || LINEAR || — || align=right | 2.1 km || 
|-id=458 bgcolor=#E9E9E9
| 182458 ||  || — || September 17, 2001 || Socorro || LINEAR || — || align=right | 2.1 km || 
|-id=459 bgcolor=#E9E9E9
| 182459 ||  || — || September 17, 2001 || Socorro || LINEAR || ADE || align=right | 4.9 km || 
|-id=460 bgcolor=#E9E9E9
| 182460 ||  || — || September 20, 2001 || Socorro || LINEAR || — || align=right | 1.5 km || 
|-id=461 bgcolor=#E9E9E9
| 182461 ||  || — || September 20, 2001 || Socorro || LINEAR || — || align=right | 1.8 km || 
|-id=462 bgcolor=#fefefe
| 182462 ||  || — || September 20, 2001 || Socorro || LINEAR || NYS || align=right data-sort-value="0.89" | 890 m || 
|-id=463 bgcolor=#E9E9E9
| 182463 ||  || — || September 20, 2001 || Socorro || LINEAR || WIT || align=right | 1.3 km || 
|-id=464 bgcolor=#E9E9E9
| 182464 ||  || — || September 20, 2001 || Socorro || LINEAR || — || align=right | 2.9 km || 
|-id=465 bgcolor=#E9E9E9
| 182465 ||  || — || September 20, 2001 || Socorro || LINEAR || WIT || align=right | 1.5 km || 
|-id=466 bgcolor=#E9E9E9
| 182466 ||  || — || September 20, 2001 || Socorro || LINEAR || — || align=right | 1.9 km || 
|-id=467 bgcolor=#E9E9E9
| 182467 ||  || — || September 20, 2001 || Socorro || LINEAR || — || align=right | 1.5 km || 
|-id=468 bgcolor=#E9E9E9
| 182468 ||  || — || September 20, 2001 || Socorro || LINEAR || — || align=right | 1.8 km || 
|-id=469 bgcolor=#E9E9E9
| 182469 ||  || — || September 20, 2001 || Socorro || LINEAR || — || align=right | 1.2 km || 
|-id=470 bgcolor=#E9E9E9
| 182470 ||  || — || September 20, 2001 || Socorro || LINEAR || — || align=right | 2.2 km || 
|-id=471 bgcolor=#E9E9E9
| 182471 ||  || — || September 20, 2001 || Socorro || LINEAR || — || align=right | 2.8 km || 
|-id=472 bgcolor=#E9E9E9
| 182472 ||  || — || September 20, 2001 || Socorro || LINEAR || — || align=right | 3.7 km || 
|-id=473 bgcolor=#E9E9E9
| 182473 ||  || — || September 20, 2001 || Socorro || LINEAR || — || align=right | 1.6 km || 
|-id=474 bgcolor=#E9E9E9
| 182474 ||  || — || September 20, 2001 || Socorro || LINEAR || IAN || align=right | 1.4 km || 
|-id=475 bgcolor=#fefefe
| 182475 ||  || — || September 20, 2001 || Desert Eagle || W. K. Y. Yeung || H || align=right data-sort-value="0.88" | 880 m || 
|-id=476 bgcolor=#E9E9E9
| 182476 ||  || — || September 22, 2001 || Goodricke-Pigott || R. A. Tucker || DOR || align=right | 4.5 km || 
|-id=477 bgcolor=#E9E9E9
| 182477 ||  || — || September 16, 2001 || Socorro || LINEAR || — || align=right | 1.7 km || 
|-id=478 bgcolor=#E9E9E9
| 182478 ||  || — || September 16, 2001 || Socorro || LINEAR || — || align=right | 1.7 km || 
|-id=479 bgcolor=#d6d6d6
| 182479 ||  || — || September 16, 2001 || Socorro || LINEAR || — || align=right | 3.9 km || 
|-id=480 bgcolor=#E9E9E9
| 182480 ||  || — || September 16, 2001 || Socorro || LINEAR || — || align=right | 1.1 km || 
|-id=481 bgcolor=#E9E9E9
| 182481 ||  || — || September 16, 2001 || Socorro || LINEAR || — || align=right | 3.5 km || 
|-id=482 bgcolor=#E9E9E9
| 182482 ||  || — || September 16, 2001 || Socorro || LINEAR || — || align=right | 1.9 km || 
|-id=483 bgcolor=#E9E9E9
| 182483 ||  || — || September 16, 2001 || Socorro || LINEAR || — || align=right | 1.6 km || 
|-id=484 bgcolor=#E9E9E9
| 182484 ||  || — || September 16, 2001 || Socorro || LINEAR || — || align=right | 1.4 km || 
|-id=485 bgcolor=#E9E9E9
| 182485 ||  || — || September 16, 2001 || Socorro || LINEAR || — || align=right | 4.4 km || 
|-id=486 bgcolor=#E9E9E9
| 182486 ||  || — || September 16, 2001 || Socorro || LINEAR || NEM || align=right | 2.8 km || 
|-id=487 bgcolor=#C2FFFF
| 182487 ||  || — || September 17, 2001 || Socorro || LINEAR || L5 || align=right | 16 km || 
|-id=488 bgcolor=#E9E9E9
| 182488 ||  || — || September 17, 2001 || Socorro || LINEAR || — || align=right | 3.1 km || 
|-id=489 bgcolor=#E9E9E9
| 182489 ||  || — || September 17, 2001 || Socorro || LINEAR || GEF || align=right | 2.7 km || 
|-id=490 bgcolor=#E9E9E9
| 182490 ||  || — || September 17, 2001 || Socorro || LINEAR || — || align=right | 4.7 km || 
|-id=491 bgcolor=#E9E9E9
| 182491 ||  || — || September 19, 2001 || Socorro || LINEAR || HEN || align=right | 1.6 km || 
|-id=492 bgcolor=#E9E9E9
| 182492 ||  || — || September 16, 2001 || Socorro || LINEAR || — || align=right | 1.8 km || 
|-id=493 bgcolor=#E9E9E9
| 182493 ||  || — || September 16, 2001 || Socorro || LINEAR || — || align=right | 2.7 km || 
|-id=494 bgcolor=#E9E9E9
| 182494 ||  || — || September 19, 2001 || Socorro || LINEAR || EUN || align=right | 2.0 km || 
|-id=495 bgcolor=#fefefe
| 182495 ||  || — || September 19, 2001 || Socorro || LINEAR || — || align=right data-sort-value="0.96" | 960 m || 
|-id=496 bgcolor=#E9E9E9
| 182496 ||  || — || September 19, 2001 || Socorro || LINEAR || — || align=right | 1.8 km || 
|-id=497 bgcolor=#d6d6d6
| 182497 ||  || — || September 19, 2001 || Socorro || LINEAR || HYG || align=right | 3.8 km || 
|-id=498 bgcolor=#E9E9E9
| 182498 ||  || — || September 19, 2001 || Socorro || LINEAR || — || align=right | 2.1 km || 
|-id=499 bgcolor=#fefefe
| 182499 ||  || — || September 19, 2001 || Socorro || LINEAR || CIM || align=right | 3.1 km || 
|-id=500 bgcolor=#E9E9E9
| 182500 ||  || — || September 19, 2001 || Socorro || LINEAR || — || align=right | 3.1 km || 
|}

182501–182600 

|-bgcolor=#E9E9E9
| 182501 ||  || — || September 19, 2001 || Socorro || LINEAR || — || align=right | 2.2 km || 
|-id=502 bgcolor=#E9E9E9
| 182502 ||  || — || September 19, 2001 || Socorro || LINEAR || — || align=right | 1.4 km || 
|-id=503 bgcolor=#E9E9E9
| 182503 ||  || — || September 19, 2001 || Socorro || LINEAR || — || align=right | 2.6 km || 
|-id=504 bgcolor=#E9E9E9
| 182504 ||  || — || September 19, 2001 || Socorro || LINEAR || — || align=right | 2.7 km || 
|-id=505 bgcolor=#E9E9E9
| 182505 ||  || — || September 19, 2001 || Socorro || LINEAR || HEN || align=right | 1.5 km || 
|-id=506 bgcolor=#C2FFFF
| 182506 ||  || — || September 19, 2001 || Socorro || LINEAR || L5 || align=right | 18 km || 
|-id=507 bgcolor=#E9E9E9
| 182507 ||  || — || September 19, 2001 || Socorro || LINEAR || — || align=right | 3.5 km || 
|-id=508 bgcolor=#E9E9E9
| 182508 ||  || — || September 19, 2001 || Socorro || LINEAR || — || align=right | 1.3 km || 
|-id=509 bgcolor=#E9E9E9
| 182509 ||  || — || September 19, 2001 || Socorro || LINEAR || — || align=right | 2.4 km || 
|-id=510 bgcolor=#E9E9E9
| 182510 ||  || — || September 19, 2001 || Socorro || LINEAR || — || align=right | 2.5 km || 
|-id=511 bgcolor=#E9E9E9
| 182511 ||  || — || September 20, 2001 || Socorro || LINEAR || HNS || align=right | 1.9 km || 
|-id=512 bgcolor=#E9E9E9
| 182512 ||  || — || September 25, 2001 || Desert Eagle || W. K. Y. Yeung || — || align=right | 2.6 km || 
|-id=513 bgcolor=#E9E9E9
| 182513 ||  || — || September 19, 2001 || Kitt Peak || Spacewatch || — || align=right | 1.4 km || 
|-id=514 bgcolor=#E9E9E9
| 182514 ||  || — || September 20, 2001 || Kitt Peak || Spacewatch || — || align=right | 3.2 km || 
|-id=515 bgcolor=#fefefe
| 182515 ||  || — || September 21, 2001 || Palomar || NEAT || H || align=right | 1.0 km || 
|-id=516 bgcolor=#C2FFFF
| 182516 ||  || — || September 19, 2001 || Socorro || LINEAR || L5 || align=right | 9.9 km || 
|-id=517 bgcolor=#d6d6d6
| 182517 ||  || — || September 19, 2001 || Socorro || LINEAR || fast? || align=right | 2.8 km || 
|-id=518 bgcolor=#E9E9E9
| 182518 ||  || — || September 23, 2001 || Socorro || LINEAR || — || align=right | 1.5 km || 
|-id=519 bgcolor=#E9E9E9
| 182519 ||  || — || September 19, 2001 || Socorro || LINEAR || — || align=right | 3.8 km || 
|-id=520 bgcolor=#E9E9E9
| 182520 ||  || — || September 21, 2001 || Socorro || LINEAR || — || align=right | 1.7 km || 
|-id=521 bgcolor=#E9E9E9
| 182521 ||  || — || September 18, 2001 || Anderson Mesa || LONEOS || — || align=right | 1.3 km || 
|-id=522 bgcolor=#C2FFFF
| 182522 ||  || — || September 20, 2001 || Socorro || LINEAR || L5 || align=right | 11 km || 
|-id=523 bgcolor=#E9E9E9
| 182523 ||  || — || September 21, 2001 || Socorro || LINEAR || — || align=right | 3.0 km || 
|-id=524 bgcolor=#E9E9E9
| 182524 ||  || — || September 21, 2001 || Socorro || LINEAR || — || align=right | 1.2 km || 
|-id=525 bgcolor=#E9E9E9
| 182525 ||  || — || September 19, 2001 || Socorro || LINEAR || — || align=right | 2.2 km || 
|-id=526 bgcolor=#E9E9E9
| 182526 ||  || — || September 19, 2001 || Socorro || LINEAR || — || align=right | 2.3 km || 
|-id=527 bgcolor=#E9E9E9
| 182527 ||  || — || October 10, 2001 || Palomar || NEAT || — || align=right | 3.7 km || 
|-id=528 bgcolor=#E9E9E9
| 182528 ||  || — || October 13, 2001 || Socorro || LINEAR || — || align=right | 2.3 km || 
|-id=529 bgcolor=#E9E9E9
| 182529 ||  || — || October 13, 2001 || Socorro || LINEAR || — || align=right | 3.8 km || 
|-id=530 bgcolor=#E9E9E9
| 182530 ||  || — || October 13, 2001 || Socorro || LINEAR || — || align=right | 3.2 km || 
|-id=531 bgcolor=#E9E9E9
| 182531 ||  || — || October 13, 2001 || Socorro || LINEAR || AGN || align=right | 1.6 km || 
|-id=532 bgcolor=#E9E9E9
| 182532 ||  || — || October 14, 2001 || Socorro || LINEAR || — || align=right | 2.3 km || 
|-id=533 bgcolor=#E9E9E9
| 182533 ||  || — || October 14, 2001 || Socorro || LINEAR || — || align=right | 3.7 km || 
|-id=534 bgcolor=#E9E9E9
| 182534 ||  || — || October 14, 2001 || Socorro || LINEAR || — || align=right | 2.8 km || 
|-id=535 bgcolor=#d6d6d6
| 182535 ||  || — || October 14, 2001 || Socorro || LINEAR || — || align=right | 4.8 km || 
|-id=536 bgcolor=#E9E9E9
| 182536 ||  || — || October 14, 2001 || Socorro || LINEAR || EUN || align=right | 2.0 km || 
|-id=537 bgcolor=#E9E9E9
| 182537 ||  || — || October 14, 2001 || Socorro || LINEAR || — || align=right | 4.4 km || 
|-id=538 bgcolor=#E9E9E9
| 182538 ||  || — || October 14, 2001 || Socorro || LINEAR || — || align=right | 4.2 km || 
|-id=539 bgcolor=#fefefe
| 182539 ||  || — || October 11, 2001 || Socorro || LINEAR || H || align=right | 1.1 km || 
|-id=540 bgcolor=#E9E9E9
| 182540 ||  || — || October 11, 2001 || Socorro || LINEAR || — || align=right | 2.8 km || 
|-id=541 bgcolor=#C2FFFF
| 182541 ||  || — || October 13, 2001 || Socorro || LINEAR || L5 || align=right | 12 km || 
|-id=542 bgcolor=#E9E9E9
| 182542 ||  || — || October 13, 2001 || Socorro || LINEAR || WIT || align=right | 1.4 km || 
|-id=543 bgcolor=#E9E9E9
| 182543 ||  || — || October 13, 2001 || Socorro || LINEAR || MAR || align=right | 1.7 km || 
|-id=544 bgcolor=#E9E9E9
| 182544 ||  || — || October 13, 2001 || Socorro || LINEAR || — || align=right | 2.7 km || 
|-id=545 bgcolor=#d6d6d6
| 182545 ||  || — || October 13, 2001 || Socorro || LINEAR || — || align=right | 4.1 km || 
|-id=546 bgcolor=#E9E9E9
| 182546 ||  || — || October 14, 2001 || Socorro || LINEAR || RAF || align=right | 1.9 km || 
|-id=547 bgcolor=#E9E9E9
| 182547 ||  || — || October 14, 2001 || Socorro || LINEAR || — || align=right | 1.6 km || 
|-id=548 bgcolor=#C2FFFF
| 182548 ||  || — || October 14, 2001 || Socorro || LINEAR || L5 || align=right | 12 km || 
|-id=549 bgcolor=#E9E9E9
| 182549 ||  || — || October 14, 2001 || Socorro || LINEAR || — || align=right | 1.6 km || 
|-id=550 bgcolor=#E9E9E9
| 182550 ||  || — || October 14, 2001 || Socorro || LINEAR || — || align=right | 2.2 km || 
|-id=551 bgcolor=#E9E9E9
| 182551 ||  || — || October 14, 2001 || Socorro || LINEAR || HNA || align=right | 2.4 km || 
|-id=552 bgcolor=#E9E9E9
| 182552 ||  || — || October 14, 2001 || Socorro || LINEAR || — || align=right | 3.2 km || 
|-id=553 bgcolor=#E9E9E9
| 182553 ||  || — || October 14, 2001 || Socorro || LINEAR || ADE || align=right | 2.8 km || 
|-id=554 bgcolor=#E9E9E9
| 182554 ||  || — || October 14, 2001 || Socorro || LINEAR || — || align=right | 2.3 km || 
|-id=555 bgcolor=#E9E9E9
| 182555 ||  || — || October 14, 2001 || Socorro || LINEAR || — || align=right | 1.9 km || 
|-id=556 bgcolor=#E9E9E9
| 182556 ||  || — || October 14, 2001 || Socorro || LINEAR || WIT || align=right | 1.6 km || 
|-id=557 bgcolor=#E9E9E9
| 182557 ||  || — || October 14, 2001 || Socorro || LINEAR || — || align=right | 3.1 km || 
|-id=558 bgcolor=#E9E9E9
| 182558 ||  || — || October 14, 2001 || Socorro || LINEAR || — || align=right | 2.5 km || 
|-id=559 bgcolor=#E9E9E9
| 182559 ||  || — || October 13, 2001 || Kitt Peak || Spacewatch || HEN || align=right | 1.4 km || 
|-id=560 bgcolor=#E9E9E9
| 182560 ||  || — || October 14, 2001 || Kitt Peak || Spacewatch || — || align=right | 1.8 km || 
|-id=561 bgcolor=#E9E9E9
| 182561 ||  || — || October 15, 2001 || Kitt Peak || Spacewatch || — || align=right | 3.3 km || 
|-id=562 bgcolor=#E9E9E9
| 182562 ||  || — || October 10, 2001 || Palomar || NEAT || — || align=right | 1.6 km || 
|-id=563 bgcolor=#E9E9E9
| 182563 ||  || — || October 10, 2001 || Palomar || NEAT || — || align=right | 2.6 km || 
|-id=564 bgcolor=#E9E9E9
| 182564 ||  || — || October 10, 2001 || Palomar || NEAT || — || align=right | 1.3 km || 
|-id=565 bgcolor=#E9E9E9
| 182565 ||  || — || October 10, 2001 || Palomar || NEAT || — || align=right | 1.6 km || 
|-id=566 bgcolor=#E9E9E9
| 182566 ||  || — || October 10, 2001 || Palomar || NEAT || — || align=right | 3.1 km || 
|-id=567 bgcolor=#E9E9E9
| 182567 ||  || — || October 10, 2001 || Palomar || NEAT || AGN || align=right | 1.5 km || 
|-id=568 bgcolor=#E9E9E9
| 182568 ||  || — || October 10, 2001 || Palomar || NEAT || — || align=right | 3.4 km || 
|-id=569 bgcolor=#E9E9E9
| 182569 ||  || — || October 10, 2001 || Palomar || NEAT || — || align=right | 2.0 km || 
|-id=570 bgcolor=#E9E9E9
| 182570 ||  || — || October 10, 2001 || Palomar || NEAT || — || align=right | 4.8 km || 
|-id=571 bgcolor=#E9E9E9
| 182571 ||  || — || October 14, 2001 || Kitt Peak || Spacewatch || — || align=right | 2.2 km || 
|-id=572 bgcolor=#E9E9E9
| 182572 ||  || — || October 11, 2001 || Palomar || NEAT || — || align=right | 3.2 km || 
|-id=573 bgcolor=#E9E9E9
| 182573 ||  || — || October 15, 2001 || Palomar || NEAT || — || align=right | 1.8 km || 
|-id=574 bgcolor=#E9E9E9
| 182574 ||  || — || October 11, 2001 || Palomar || NEAT || — || align=right | 2.4 km || 
|-id=575 bgcolor=#E9E9E9
| 182575 ||  || — || October 13, 2001 || Socorro || LINEAR || — || align=right | 3.5 km || 
|-id=576 bgcolor=#d6d6d6
| 182576 ||  || — || October 15, 2001 || Socorro || LINEAR || — || align=right | 2.8 km || 
|-id=577 bgcolor=#E9E9E9
| 182577 ||  || — || October 15, 2001 || Socorro || LINEAR || NEM || align=right | 2.1 km || 
|-id=578 bgcolor=#E9E9E9
| 182578 ||  || — || October 14, 2001 || Socorro || LINEAR || EUN || align=right | 2.1 km || 
|-id=579 bgcolor=#E9E9E9
| 182579 ||  || — || October 14, 2001 || Socorro || LINEAR || — || align=right | 1.2 km || 
|-id=580 bgcolor=#E9E9E9
| 182580 ||  || — || October 14, 2001 || Socorro || LINEAR || — || align=right | 2.8 km || 
|-id=581 bgcolor=#E9E9E9
| 182581 ||  || — || October 14, 2001 || Socorro || LINEAR || HEN || align=right | 1.4 km || 
|-id=582 bgcolor=#E9E9E9
| 182582 ||  || — || October 14, 2001 || Socorro || LINEAR || — || align=right | 2.8 km || 
|-id=583 bgcolor=#E9E9E9
| 182583 ||  || — || October 11, 2001 || Socorro || LINEAR || — || align=right | 1.5 km || 
|-id=584 bgcolor=#d6d6d6
| 182584 ||  || — || October 11, 2001 || Palomar || NEAT || — || align=right | 4.8 km || 
|-id=585 bgcolor=#E9E9E9
| 182585 ||  || — || October 14, 2001 || Anderson Mesa || LONEOS || — || align=right | 5.4 km || 
|-id=586 bgcolor=#E9E9E9
| 182586 ||  || — || October 14, 2001 || Socorro || LINEAR || — || align=right | 1.2 km || 
|-id=587 bgcolor=#E9E9E9
| 182587 ||  || — || October 14, 2001 || Socorro || LINEAR || — || align=right | 3.8 km || 
|-id=588 bgcolor=#E9E9E9
| 182588 ||  || — || October 14, 2001 || Palomar || NEAT || EUN || align=right | 2.4 km || 
|-id=589 bgcolor=#E9E9E9
| 182589 ||  || — || October 15, 2001 || Palomar || NEAT || — || align=right | 3.1 km || 
|-id=590 bgcolor=#E9E9E9
| 182590 Vladisvujnovic ||  ||  || October 14, 2001 || Apache Point || SDSS || HEN || align=right | 1.1 km || 
|-id=591 bgcolor=#E9E9E9
| 182591 Mocescobedo ||  ||  || October 14, 2001 || Apache Point || SDSS || — || align=right | 2.6 km || 
|-id=592 bgcolor=#E9E9E9
| 182592 Jolana ||  ||  || October 8, 2001 || Palomar || NEAT || — || align=right | 2.4 km || 
|-id=593 bgcolor=#E9E9E9
| 182593 ||  || — || October 19, 2001 || Nacogdoches || SFA Obs. || — || align=right | 2.5 km || 
|-id=594 bgcolor=#fefefe
| 182594 ||  || — || October 17, 2001 || Socorro || LINEAR || H || align=right data-sort-value="0.90" | 900 m || 
|-id=595 bgcolor=#E9E9E9
| 182595 ||  || — || October 29, 2001 || Emerald Lane || L. Ball || — || align=right | 2.7 km || 
|-id=596 bgcolor=#fefefe
| 182596 ||  || — || October 17, 2001 || Socorro || LINEAR || H || align=right | 1.2 km || 
|-id=597 bgcolor=#E9E9E9
| 182597 ||  || — || October 16, 2001 || Socorro || LINEAR || — || align=right | 2.7 km || 
|-id=598 bgcolor=#E9E9E9
| 182598 ||  || — || October 16, 2001 || Socorro || LINEAR || PAD || align=right | 4.9 km || 
|-id=599 bgcolor=#E9E9E9
| 182599 ||  || — || October 16, 2001 || Socorro || LINEAR || — || align=right | 1.5 km || 
|-id=600 bgcolor=#E9E9E9
| 182600 ||  || — || October 16, 2001 || Socorro || LINEAR || — || align=right | 4.7 km || 
|}

182601–182700 

|-bgcolor=#E9E9E9
| 182601 ||  || — || October 17, 2001 || Socorro || LINEAR || — || align=right | 3.4 km || 
|-id=602 bgcolor=#E9E9E9
| 182602 ||  || — || October 17, 2001 || Socorro || LINEAR || — || align=right | 3.6 km || 
|-id=603 bgcolor=#E9E9E9
| 182603 ||  || — || October 17, 2001 || Socorro || LINEAR || — || align=right | 2.3 km || 
|-id=604 bgcolor=#d6d6d6
| 182604 ||  || — || October 17, 2001 || Socorro || LINEAR || — || align=right | 3.3 km || 
|-id=605 bgcolor=#E9E9E9
| 182605 ||  || — || October 17, 2001 || Socorro || LINEAR || — || align=right | 1.5 km || 
|-id=606 bgcolor=#E9E9E9
| 182606 ||  || — || October 17, 2001 || Socorro || LINEAR || — || align=right | 2.0 km || 
|-id=607 bgcolor=#E9E9E9
| 182607 ||  || — || October 17, 2001 || Socorro || LINEAR || — || align=right | 2.2 km || 
|-id=608 bgcolor=#E9E9E9
| 182608 ||  || — || October 17, 2001 || Socorro || LINEAR || MAR || align=right | 2.1 km || 
|-id=609 bgcolor=#E9E9E9
| 182609 ||  || — || October 17, 2001 || Socorro || LINEAR || — || align=right | 2.9 km || 
|-id=610 bgcolor=#E9E9E9
| 182610 ||  || — || October 17, 2001 || Socorro || LINEAR || — || align=right | 3.2 km || 
|-id=611 bgcolor=#E9E9E9
| 182611 ||  || — || October 17, 2001 || Socorro || LINEAR || — || align=right | 1.8 km || 
|-id=612 bgcolor=#E9E9E9
| 182612 ||  || — || October 17, 2001 || Socorro || LINEAR || — || align=right | 3.3 km || 
|-id=613 bgcolor=#E9E9E9
| 182613 ||  || — || October 17, 2001 || Socorro || LINEAR || — || align=right | 2.6 km || 
|-id=614 bgcolor=#d6d6d6
| 182614 ||  || — || October 17, 2001 || Kitt Peak || Spacewatch || — || align=right | 3.1 km || 
|-id=615 bgcolor=#E9E9E9
| 182615 ||  || — || October 20, 2001 || Socorro || LINEAR || WIT || align=right | 1.7 km || 
|-id=616 bgcolor=#E9E9E9
| 182616 ||  || — || October 20, 2001 || Socorro || LINEAR || — || align=right | 2.3 km || 
|-id=617 bgcolor=#E9E9E9
| 182617 ||  || — || October 20, 2001 || Socorro || LINEAR || — || align=right | 3.2 km || 
|-id=618 bgcolor=#E9E9E9
| 182618 ||  || — || October 18, 2001 || Palomar || NEAT || EUN || align=right | 1.8 km || 
|-id=619 bgcolor=#d6d6d6
| 182619 ||  || — || October 20, 2001 || Socorro || LINEAR || THM || align=right | 2.9 km || 
|-id=620 bgcolor=#E9E9E9
| 182620 ||  || — || October 20, 2001 || Socorro || LINEAR || — || align=right | 2.7 km || 
|-id=621 bgcolor=#d6d6d6
| 182621 ||  || — || October 20, 2001 || Socorro || LINEAR || THM || align=right | 3.2 km || 
|-id=622 bgcolor=#E9E9E9
| 182622 ||  || — || October 20, 2001 || Socorro || LINEAR || — || align=right | 2.3 km || 
|-id=623 bgcolor=#E9E9E9
| 182623 ||  || — || October 20, 2001 || Socorro || LINEAR || — || align=right | 4.1 km || 
|-id=624 bgcolor=#E9E9E9
| 182624 ||  || — || October 22, 2001 || Socorro || LINEAR || — || align=right | 3.7 km || 
|-id=625 bgcolor=#C2FFFF
| 182625 ||  || — || October 22, 2001 || Socorro || LINEAR || L5 || align=right | 16 km || 
|-id=626 bgcolor=#d6d6d6
| 182626 ||  || — || October 22, 2001 || Socorro || LINEAR || 615 || align=right | 2.1 km || 
|-id=627 bgcolor=#C2FFFF
| 182627 ||  || — || October 22, 2001 || Palomar || NEAT || L5 || align=right | 16 km || 
|-id=628 bgcolor=#d6d6d6
| 182628 ||  || — || October 23, 2001 || Palomar || NEAT || — || align=right | 3.0 km || 
|-id=629 bgcolor=#E9E9E9
| 182629 ||  || — || October 20, 2001 || Socorro || LINEAR || PAD || align=right | 2.6 km || 
|-id=630 bgcolor=#d6d6d6
| 182630 ||  || — || October 23, 2001 || Socorro || LINEAR || — || align=right | 2.8 km || 
|-id=631 bgcolor=#E9E9E9
| 182631 ||  || — || October 23, 2001 || Socorro || LINEAR || RAF || align=right | 1.7 km || 
|-id=632 bgcolor=#E9E9E9
| 182632 ||  || — || October 23, 2001 || Socorro || LINEAR || — || align=right | 1.8 km || 
|-id=633 bgcolor=#E9E9E9
| 182633 ||  || — || October 23, 2001 || Socorro || LINEAR || — || align=right | 3.2 km || 
|-id=634 bgcolor=#E9E9E9
| 182634 ||  || — || October 23, 2001 || Socorro || LINEAR || AGN || align=right | 1.6 km || 
|-id=635 bgcolor=#E9E9E9
| 182635 ||  || — || October 23, 2001 || Socorro || LINEAR || — || align=right | 3.3 km || 
|-id=636 bgcolor=#E9E9E9
| 182636 ||  || — || October 23, 2001 || Socorro || LINEAR || — || align=right | 2.1 km || 
|-id=637 bgcolor=#d6d6d6
| 182637 ||  || — || October 23, 2001 || Socorro || LINEAR || — || align=right | 2.7 km || 
|-id=638 bgcolor=#E9E9E9
| 182638 ||  || — || October 23, 2001 || Socorro || LINEAR || AGN || align=right | 2.0 km || 
|-id=639 bgcolor=#d6d6d6
| 182639 ||  || — || October 23, 2001 || Socorro || LINEAR || — || align=right | 3.3 km || 
|-id=640 bgcolor=#E9E9E9
| 182640 ||  || — || October 23, 2001 || Socorro || LINEAR || — || align=right | 3.4 km || 
|-id=641 bgcolor=#E9E9E9
| 182641 ||  || — || October 23, 2001 || Socorro || LINEAR || — || align=right | 3.3 km || 
|-id=642 bgcolor=#E9E9E9
| 182642 ||  || — || October 23, 2001 || Socorro || LINEAR || — || align=right | 2.6 km || 
|-id=643 bgcolor=#E9E9E9
| 182643 ||  || — || October 23, 2001 || Socorro || LINEAR || GEF || align=right | 2.0 km || 
|-id=644 bgcolor=#E9E9E9
| 182644 ||  || — || October 23, 2001 || Socorro || LINEAR || — || align=right | 3.8 km || 
|-id=645 bgcolor=#E9E9E9
| 182645 ||  || — || October 23, 2001 || Socorro || LINEAR || — || align=right | 2.4 km || 
|-id=646 bgcolor=#d6d6d6
| 182646 ||  || — || October 23, 2001 || Palomar || NEAT || EOS || align=right | 3.0 km || 
|-id=647 bgcolor=#C2FFFF
| 182647 ||  || — || October 21, 2001 || Socorro || LINEAR || L5 || align=right | 18 km || 
|-id=648 bgcolor=#E9E9E9
| 182648 ||  || — || October 24, 2001 || Palomar || NEAT || — || align=right | 2.5 km || 
|-id=649 bgcolor=#E9E9E9
| 182649 ||  || — || October 20, 2001 || Socorro || LINEAR || — || align=right | 2.1 km || 
|-id=650 bgcolor=#E9E9E9
| 182650 ||  || — || October 21, 2001 || Socorro || LINEAR || PAD || align=right | 2.7 km || 
|-id=651 bgcolor=#E9E9E9
| 182651 ||  || — || October 24, 2001 || Socorro || LINEAR || — || align=right | 1.5 km || 
|-id=652 bgcolor=#E9E9E9
| 182652 ||  || — || October 16, 2001 || Socorro || LINEAR || — || align=right | 2.5 km || 
|-id=653 bgcolor=#E9E9E9
| 182653 ||  || — || October 17, 2001 || Palomar || NEAT || — || align=right | 3.3 km || 
|-id=654 bgcolor=#E9E9E9
| 182654 ||  || — || October 17, 2001 || Socorro || LINEAR || — || align=right | 3.3 km || 
|-id=655 bgcolor=#E9E9E9
| 182655 ||  || — || October 18, 2001 || Palomar || NEAT || — || align=right | 2.1 km || 
|-id=656 bgcolor=#E9E9E9
| 182656 ||  || — || October 18, 2001 || Palomar || NEAT || — || align=right | 2.0 km || 
|-id=657 bgcolor=#d6d6d6
| 182657 ||  || — || October 18, 2001 || Palomar || NEAT || — || align=right | 2.6 km || 
|-id=658 bgcolor=#E9E9E9
| 182658 ||  || — || October 18, 2001 || Palomar || NEAT || — || align=right | 2.0 km || 
|-id=659 bgcolor=#E9E9E9
| 182659 ||  || — || October 18, 2001 || Kitt Peak || Spacewatch || AGN || align=right | 1.4 km || 
|-id=660 bgcolor=#E9E9E9
| 182660 ||  || — || October 19, 2001 || Palomar || NEAT || HOF || align=right | 4.1 km || 
|-id=661 bgcolor=#E9E9E9
| 182661 ||  || — || October 19, 2001 || Palomar || NEAT || — || align=right | 1.8 km || 
|-id=662 bgcolor=#E9E9E9
| 182662 ||  || — || October 19, 2001 || Palomar || NEAT || HEN || align=right | 3.0 km || 
|-id=663 bgcolor=#E9E9E9
| 182663 ||  || — || October 19, 2001 || Palomar || NEAT || EUN || align=right | 2.1 km || 
|-id=664 bgcolor=#E9E9E9
| 182664 ||  || — || October 19, 2001 || Palomar || NEAT || — || align=right | 3.1 km || 
|-id=665 bgcolor=#E9E9E9
| 182665 ||  || — || October 19, 2001 || Palomar || NEAT || — || align=right | 2.5 km || 
|-id=666 bgcolor=#C2FFFF
| 182666 ||  || — || October 20, 2001 || Kitt Peak || Spacewatch || L5 || align=right | 14 km || 
|-id=667 bgcolor=#E9E9E9
| 182667 ||  || — || October 20, 2001 || Socorro || LINEAR || HOF || align=right | 2.7 km || 
|-id=668 bgcolor=#E9E9E9
| 182668 ||  || — || October 20, 2001 || Kitt Peak || Spacewatch || — || align=right | 2.8 km || 
|-id=669 bgcolor=#C2FFFF
| 182669 ||  || — || October 23, 2001 || Kitt Peak || Spacewatch || L5 || align=right | 11 km || 
|-id=670 bgcolor=#E9E9E9
| 182670 ||  || — || October 23, 2001 || Socorro || LINEAR || — || align=right | 1.9 km || 
|-id=671 bgcolor=#E9E9E9
| 182671 ||  || — || October 24, 2001 || Socorro || LINEAR || AST || align=right | 2.9 km || 
|-id=672 bgcolor=#d6d6d6
| 182672 ||  || — || October 24, 2001 || Socorro || LINEAR || THM || align=right | 2.4 km || 
|-id=673 bgcolor=#d6d6d6
| 182673 ||  || — || October 25, 2001 || Socorro || LINEAR || BRA || align=right | 3.2 km || 
|-id=674 bgcolor=#E9E9E9
| 182674 ||  || — || October 25, 2001 || Apache Point || SDSS || — || align=right | 2.8 km || 
|-id=675 bgcolor=#C2FFFF
| 182675 ||  || — || October 16, 2001 || Palomar || NEAT || L5 || align=right | 13 km || 
|-id=676 bgcolor=#E9E9E9
| 182676 ||  || — || October 16, 2001 || Palomar || NEAT || HOF || align=right | 2.8 km || 
|-id=677 bgcolor=#d6d6d6
| 182677 ||  || — || October 24, 2001 || Palomar || NEAT || CHA || align=right | 2.7 km || 
|-id=678 bgcolor=#E9E9E9
| 182678 ||  || — || November 9, 2001 || Palomar || NEAT || — || align=right | 3.9 km || 
|-id=679 bgcolor=#E9E9E9
| 182679 ||  || — || November 9, 2001 || Socorro || LINEAR || — || align=right | 2.1 km || 
|-id=680 bgcolor=#E9E9E9
| 182680 ||  || — || November 9, 2001 || Socorro || LINEAR || — || align=right | 4.6 km || 
|-id=681 bgcolor=#E9E9E9
| 182681 ||  || — || November 9, 2001 || Socorro || LINEAR || — || align=right | 3.4 km || 
|-id=682 bgcolor=#d6d6d6
| 182682 ||  || — || November 9, 2001 || Socorro || LINEAR || — || align=right | 2.5 km || 
|-id=683 bgcolor=#E9E9E9
| 182683 ||  || — || November 9, 2001 || Socorro || LINEAR || NEM || align=right | 3.0 km || 
|-id=684 bgcolor=#E9E9E9
| 182684 ||  || — || November 9, 2001 || Socorro || LINEAR || MAR || align=right | 1.9 km || 
|-id=685 bgcolor=#E9E9E9
| 182685 ||  || — || November 9, 2001 || Socorro || LINEAR || — || align=right | 2.9 km || 
|-id=686 bgcolor=#E9E9E9
| 182686 ||  || — || November 9, 2001 || Socorro || LINEAR || — || align=right | 3.0 km || 
|-id=687 bgcolor=#d6d6d6
| 182687 ||  || — || November 9, 2001 || Socorro || LINEAR || — || align=right | 3.4 km || 
|-id=688 bgcolor=#fefefe
| 182688 ||  || — || November 9, 2001 || Socorro || LINEAR || H || align=right | 1.0 km || 
|-id=689 bgcolor=#d6d6d6
| 182689 ||  || — || November 9, 2001 || Socorro || LINEAR || — || align=right | 7.5 km || 
|-id=690 bgcolor=#d6d6d6
| 182690 ||  || — || November 10, 2001 || Socorro || LINEAR || TIR || align=right | 4.7 km || 
|-id=691 bgcolor=#E9E9E9
| 182691 ||  || — || November 10, 2001 || Socorro || LINEAR || — || align=right | 2.4 km || 
|-id=692 bgcolor=#d6d6d6
| 182692 ||  || — || November 10, 2001 || Socorro || LINEAR || — || align=right | 4.4 km || 
|-id=693 bgcolor=#d6d6d6
| 182693 ||  || — || November 11, 2001 || Socorro || LINEAR || — || align=right | 3.1 km || 
|-id=694 bgcolor=#E9E9E9
| 182694 ||  || — || November 12, 2001 || Kitt Peak || Spacewatch || — || align=right | 2.0 km || 
|-id=695 bgcolor=#fefefe
| 182695 ||  || — || November 15, 2001 || Socorro || LINEAR || H || align=right data-sort-value="0.86" | 860 m || 
|-id=696 bgcolor=#E9E9E9
| 182696 ||  || — || November 15, 2001 || Socorro || LINEAR || — || align=right | 4.5 km || 
|-id=697 bgcolor=#d6d6d6
| 182697 ||  || — || November 15, 2001 || Socorro || LINEAR || — || align=right | 3.5 km || 
|-id=698 bgcolor=#E9E9E9
| 182698 ||  || — || November 15, 2001 || Socorro || LINEAR || — || align=right | 3.6 km || 
|-id=699 bgcolor=#d6d6d6
| 182699 ||  || — || November 12, 2001 || Anderson Mesa || LONEOS || — || align=right | 6.9 km || 
|-id=700 bgcolor=#E9E9E9
| 182700 ||  || — || November 12, 2001 || Socorro || LINEAR || MRX || align=right | 1.6 km || 
|}

182701–182800 

|-bgcolor=#E9E9E9
| 182701 ||  || — || November 12, 2001 || Socorro || LINEAR || AGN || align=right | 1.7 km || 
|-id=702 bgcolor=#E9E9E9
| 182702 ||  || — || November 12, 2001 || Socorro || LINEAR || ADE || align=right | 3.4 km || 
|-id=703 bgcolor=#E9E9E9
| 182703 ||  || — || November 12, 2001 || Anderson Mesa || LONEOS || — || align=right | 3.3 km || 
|-id=704 bgcolor=#E9E9E9
| 182704 ||  || — || November 16, 2001 || Kitt Peak || Spacewatch || — || align=right | 1.7 km || 
|-id=705 bgcolor=#d6d6d6
| 182705 ||  || — || November 17, 2001 || Socorro || LINEAR || — || align=right | 5.5 km || 
|-id=706 bgcolor=#d6d6d6
| 182706 ||  || — || November 17, 2001 || Socorro || LINEAR || EOS || align=right | 3.1 km || 
|-id=707 bgcolor=#E9E9E9
| 182707 ||  || — || November 17, 2001 || Socorro || LINEAR || AGN || align=right | 2.1 km || 
|-id=708 bgcolor=#E9E9E9
| 182708 ||  || — || November 17, 2001 || Socorro || LINEAR || — || align=right | 3.4 km || 
|-id=709 bgcolor=#fefefe
| 182709 ||  || — || November 25, 2001 || Socorro || LINEAR || H || align=right data-sort-value="0.99" | 990 m || 
|-id=710 bgcolor=#d6d6d6
| 182710 ||  || — || November 17, 2001 || Socorro || LINEAR || — || align=right | 4.4 km || 
|-id=711 bgcolor=#E9E9E9
| 182711 ||  || — || November 17, 2001 || Socorro || LINEAR || RAF || align=right | 1.8 km || 
|-id=712 bgcolor=#E9E9E9
| 182712 ||  || — || November 17, 2001 || Socorro || LINEAR || — || align=right | 2.9 km || 
|-id=713 bgcolor=#E9E9E9
| 182713 ||  || — || November 17, 2001 || Socorro || LINEAR || — || align=right | 3.8 km || 
|-id=714 bgcolor=#E9E9E9
| 182714 ||  || — || November 17, 2001 || Socorro || LINEAR || HEN || align=right | 1.3 km || 
|-id=715 bgcolor=#E9E9E9
| 182715 ||  || — || November 17, 2001 || Socorro || LINEAR || HEN || align=right | 1.6 km || 
|-id=716 bgcolor=#d6d6d6
| 182716 ||  || — || November 17, 2001 || Socorro || LINEAR || — || align=right | 5.9 km || 
|-id=717 bgcolor=#E9E9E9
| 182717 ||  || — || November 19, 2001 || Socorro || LINEAR || — || align=right | 3.1 km || 
|-id=718 bgcolor=#E9E9E9
| 182718 ||  || — || November 19, 2001 || Anderson Mesa || LONEOS || EUN || align=right | 1.7 km || 
|-id=719 bgcolor=#E9E9E9
| 182719 ||  || — || November 19, 2001 || Socorro || LINEAR || — || align=right | 3.1 km || 
|-id=720 bgcolor=#E9E9E9
| 182720 ||  || — || November 19, 2001 || Socorro || LINEAR || — || align=right | 2.0 km || 
|-id=721 bgcolor=#E9E9E9
| 182721 ||  || — || November 19, 2001 || Socorro || LINEAR || XIZ || align=right | 2.2 km || 
|-id=722 bgcolor=#E9E9E9
| 182722 ||  || — || November 19, 2001 || Socorro || LINEAR || AST || align=right | 2.8 km || 
|-id=723 bgcolor=#E9E9E9
| 182723 ||  || — || November 19, 2001 || Socorro || LINEAR || AGN || align=right | 1.6 km || 
|-id=724 bgcolor=#E9E9E9
| 182724 ||  || — || November 20, 2001 || Socorro || LINEAR || — || align=right | 3.1 km || 
|-id=725 bgcolor=#E9E9E9
| 182725 ||  || — || November 20, 2001 || Socorro || LINEAR || — || align=right | 3.2 km || 
|-id=726 bgcolor=#d6d6d6
| 182726 ||  || — || November 20, 2001 || Socorro || LINEAR || KOR || align=right | 1.9 km || 
|-id=727 bgcolor=#E9E9E9
| 182727 ||  || — || November 24, 2001 || Socorro || LINEAR || WIT || align=right | 1.5 km || 
|-id=728 bgcolor=#E9E9E9
| 182728 ||  || — || November 16, 2001 || Kitt Peak || Spacewatch || — || align=right | 3.0 km || 
|-id=729 bgcolor=#E9E9E9
| 182729 ||  || — || November 16, 2001 || Kitt Peak || Spacewatch || AGN || align=right | 1.9 km || 
|-id=730 bgcolor=#E9E9E9
| 182730 ||  || — || November 21, 2001 || Apache Point || SDSS || — || align=right | 2.4 km || 
|-id=731 bgcolor=#fefefe
| 182731 ||  || — || December 7, 2001 || Socorro || LINEAR || H || align=right | 1.4 km || 
|-id=732 bgcolor=#E9E9E9
| 182732 ||  || — || December 7, 2001 || Socorro || LINEAR || — || align=right | 3.0 km || 
|-id=733 bgcolor=#d6d6d6
| 182733 ||  || — || December 9, 2001 || Socorro || LINEAR || — || align=right | 4.4 km || 
|-id=734 bgcolor=#d6d6d6
| 182734 ||  || — || December 9, 2001 || Socorro || LINEAR || — || align=right | 3.9 km || 
|-id=735 bgcolor=#d6d6d6
| 182735 ||  || — || December 9, 2001 || Socorro || LINEAR || — || align=right | 4.2 km || 
|-id=736 bgcolor=#d6d6d6
| 182736 ||  || — || December 10, 2001 || Socorro || LINEAR || 628 || align=right | 2.9 km || 
|-id=737 bgcolor=#E9E9E9
| 182737 ||  || — || December 11, 2001 || Socorro || LINEAR || GEF || align=right | 1.5 km || 
|-id=738 bgcolor=#E9E9E9
| 182738 ||  || — || December 11, 2001 || Socorro || LINEAR || — || align=right | 3.6 km || 
|-id=739 bgcolor=#d6d6d6
| 182739 ||  || — || December 11, 2001 || Socorro || LINEAR || KOR || align=right | 1.9 km || 
|-id=740 bgcolor=#d6d6d6
| 182740 ||  || — || December 11, 2001 || Socorro || LINEAR || — || align=right | 4.8 km || 
|-id=741 bgcolor=#E9E9E9
| 182741 ||  || — || December 11, 2001 || Socorro || LINEAR || — || align=right | 3.5 km || 
|-id=742 bgcolor=#d6d6d6
| 182742 ||  || — || December 11, 2001 || Socorro || LINEAR || KOR || align=right | 2.1 km || 
|-id=743 bgcolor=#d6d6d6
| 182743 ||  || — || December 11, 2001 || Socorro || LINEAR || — || align=right | 4.0 km || 
|-id=744 bgcolor=#E9E9E9
| 182744 ||  || — || December 10, 2001 || Socorro || LINEAR || — || align=right | 1.6 km || 
|-id=745 bgcolor=#d6d6d6
| 182745 ||  || — || December 14, 2001 || Kitt Peak || Spacewatch || — || align=right | 3.6 km || 
|-id=746 bgcolor=#C2FFFF
| 182746 ||  || — || December 10, 2001 || Socorro || LINEAR || L5 || align=right | 21 km || 
|-id=747 bgcolor=#d6d6d6
| 182747 ||  || — || December 10, 2001 || Socorro || LINEAR || — || align=right | 5.3 km || 
|-id=748 bgcolor=#E9E9E9
| 182748 ||  || — || December 11, 2001 || Socorro || LINEAR || — || align=right | 1.4 km || 
|-id=749 bgcolor=#d6d6d6
| 182749 ||  || — || December 13, 2001 || Socorro || LINEAR || — || align=right | 4.5 km || 
|-id=750 bgcolor=#E9E9E9
| 182750 ||  || — || December 14, 2001 || Socorro || LINEAR || AGN || align=right | 1.9 km || 
|-id=751 bgcolor=#E9E9E9
| 182751 ||  || — || December 14, 2001 || Socorro || LINEAR || — || align=right | 1.7 km || 
|-id=752 bgcolor=#d6d6d6
| 182752 ||  || — || December 14, 2001 || Socorro || LINEAR || — || align=right | 2.9 km || 
|-id=753 bgcolor=#d6d6d6
| 182753 ||  || — || December 14, 2001 || Socorro || LINEAR || — || align=right | 3.7 km || 
|-id=754 bgcolor=#d6d6d6
| 182754 ||  || — || December 14, 2001 || Socorro || LINEAR || — || align=right | 3.1 km || 
|-id=755 bgcolor=#E9E9E9
| 182755 ||  || — || December 14, 2001 || Socorro || LINEAR || — || align=right | 2.0 km || 
|-id=756 bgcolor=#d6d6d6
| 182756 ||  || — || December 14, 2001 || Socorro || LINEAR || — || align=right | 2.3 km || 
|-id=757 bgcolor=#d6d6d6
| 182757 ||  || — || December 14, 2001 || Socorro || LINEAR || — || align=right | 3.5 km || 
|-id=758 bgcolor=#E9E9E9
| 182758 ||  || — || December 14, 2001 || Socorro || LINEAR || — || align=right | 3.4 km || 
|-id=759 bgcolor=#d6d6d6
| 182759 ||  || — || December 14, 2001 || Socorro || LINEAR || — || align=right | 3.4 km || 
|-id=760 bgcolor=#d6d6d6
| 182760 ||  || — || December 14, 2001 || Socorro || LINEAR || K-2 || align=right | 2.2 km || 
|-id=761 bgcolor=#E9E9E9
| 182761 ||  || — || December 14, 2001 || Socorro || LINEAR || VIB || align=right | 3.8 km || 
|-id=762 bgcolor=#d6d6d6
| 182762 ||  || — || December 14, 2001 || Socorro || LINEAR || — || align=right | 2.9 km || 
|-id=763 bgcolor=#d6d6d6
| 182763 ||  || — || December 14, 2001 || Socorro || LINEAR || TEL || align=right | 2.4 km || 
|-id=764 bgcolor=#d6d6d6
| 182764 ||  || — || December 14, 2001 || Socorro || LINEAR || EMA || align=right | 6.5 km || 
|-id=765 bgcolor=#d6d6d6
| 182765 ||  || — || December 14, 2001 || Kitt Peak || Spacewatch || — || align=right | 2.7 km || 
|-id=766 bgcolor=#E9E9E9
| 182766 ||  || — || December 11, 2001 || Socorro || LINEAR || — || align=right | 2.3 km || 
|-id=767 bgcolor=#d6d6d6
| 182767 ||  || — || December 11, 2001 || Socorro || LINEAR || CHA || align=right | 3.4 km || 
|-id=768 bgcolor=#d6d6d6
| 182768 ||  || — || December 14, 2001 || Socorro || LINEAR || KOR || align=right | 2.0 km || 
|-id=769 bgcolor=#E9E9E9
| 182769 ||  || — || December 15, 2001 || Socorro || LINEAR || — || align=right | 2.6 km || 
|-id=770 bgcolor=#E9E9E9
| 182770 ||  || — || December 15, 2001 || Socorro || LINEAR || WIT || align=right | 1.4 km || 
|-id=771 bgcolor=#d6d6d6
| 182771 ||  || — || December 15, 2001 || Socorro || LINEAR || — || align=right | 4.4 km || 
|-id=772 bgcolor=#E9E9E9
| 182772 ||  || — || December 14, 2001 || Socorro || LINEAR || — || align=right | 2.4 km || 
|-id=773 bgcolor=#d6d6d6
| 182773 ||  || — || December 14, 2001 || Socorro || LINEAR || THM || align=right | 2.8 km || 
|-id=774 bgcolor=#d6d6d6
| 182774 ||  || — || December 14, 2001 || Socorro || LINEAR || — || align=right | 3.4 km || 
|-id=775 bgcolor=#fefefe
| 182775 ||  || — || December 5, 2001 || Haleakala || NEAT || H || align=right | 1.0 km || 
|-id=776 bgcolor=#d6d6d6
| 182776 ||  || — || December 11, 2001 || Socorro || LINEAR || BRA || align=right | 2.9 km || 
|-id=777 bgcolor=#d6d6d6
| 182777 ||  || — || December 17, 2001 || Socorro || LINEAR || — || align=right | 4.7 km || 
|-id=778 bgcolor=#E9E9E9
| 182778 ||  || — || December 18, 2001 || Socorro || LINEAR || — || align=right | 2.7 km || 
|-id=779 bgcolor=#d6d6d6
| 182779 ||  || — || December 18, 2001 || Socorro || LINEAR || — || align=right | 5.1 km || 
|-id=780 bgcolor=#d6d6d6
| 182780 ||  || — || December 18, 2001 || Socorro || LINEAR || — || align=right | 3.9 km || 
|-id=781 bgcolor=#d6d6d6
| 182781 ||  || — || December 17, 2001 || Socorro || LINEAR || — || align=right | 3.4 km || 
|-id=782 bgcolor=#d6d6d6
| 182782 ||  || — || December 18, 2001 || Palomar || NEAT || — || align=right | 3.6 km || 
|-id=783 bgcolor=#E9E9E9
| 182783 ||  || — || December 17, 2001 || Socorro || LINEAR || — || align=right | 3.8 km || 
|-id=784 bgcolor=#d6d6d6
| 182784 ||  || — || December 17, 2001 || Socorro || LINEAR || — || align=right | 5.5 km || 
|-id=785 bgcolor=#E9E9E9
| 182785 ||  || — || December 17, 2001 || Socorro || LINEAR || WIT || align=right | 1.6 km || 
|-id=786 bgcolor=#d6d6d6
| 182786 ||  || — || December 18, 2001 || Apache Point || SDSS || — || align=right | 4.2 km || 
|-id=787 bgcolor=#d6d6d6
| 182787 ||  || — || January 5, 2002 || Kitt Peak || Spacewatch || HYG || align=right | 3.9 km || 
|-id=788 bgcolor=#d6d6d6
| 182788 ||  || — || January 10, 2002 || Campo Imperatore || CINEOS || — || align=right | 3.6 km || 
|-id=789 bgcolor=#fefefe
| 182789 ||  || — || January 9, 2002 || Socorro || LINEAR || H || align=right data-sort-value="0.98" | 980 m || 
|-id=790 bgcolor=#E9E9E9
| 182790 ||  || — || January 8, 2002 || Cima Ekar || ADAS || — || align=right | 4.4 km || 
|-id=791 bgcolor=#d6d6d6
| 182791 ||  || — || January 8, 2002 || Socorro || LINEAR || KOR || align=right | 1.9 km || 
|-id=792 bgcolor=#d6d6d6
| 182792 ||  || — || January 5, 2002 || Haleakala || NEAT || EOS || align=right | 3.3 km || 
|-id=793 bgcolor=#d6d6d6
| 182793 ||  || — || January 9, 2002 || Socorro || LINEAR || — || align=right | 2.9 km || 
|-id=794 bgcolor=#d6d6d6
| 182794 ||  || — || January 9, 2002 || Socorro || LINEAR || — || align=right | 3.8 km || 
|-id=795 bgcolor=#d6d6d6
| 182795 ||  || — || January 9, 2002 || Socorro || LINEAR || — || align=right | 2.8 km || 
|-id=796 bgcolor=#d6d6d6
| 182796 ||  || — || January 9, 2002 || Socorro || LINEAR || — || align=right | 4.7 km || 
|-id=797 bgcolor=#d6d6d6
| 182797 ||  || — || January 9, 2002 || Socorro || LINEAR || — || align=right | 4.7 km || 
|-id=798 bgcolor=#d6d6d6
| 182798 ||  || — || January 13, 2002 || Kitt Peak || Spacewatch || — || align=right | 2.8 km || 
|-id=799 bgcolor=#d6d6d6
| 182799 ||  || — || January 8, 2002 || Socorro || LINEAR || EOS || align=right | 3.1 km || 
|-id=800 bgcolor=#E9E9E9
| 182800 ||  || — || January 9, 2002 || Socorro || LINEAR || — || align=right | 4.6 km || 
|}

182801–182900 

|-bgcolor=#E9E9E9
| 182801 ||  || — || January 8, 2002 || Socorro || LINEAR || PAD || align=right | 2.7 km || 
|-id=802 bgcolor=#E9E9E9
| 182802 ||  || — || January 8, 2002 || Socorro || LINEAR || — || align=right | 4.0 km || 
|-id=803 bgcolor=#d6d6d6
| 182803 ||  || — || January 8, 2002 || Socorro || LINEAR || — || align=right | 4.3 km || 
|-id=804 bgcolor=#d6d6d6
| 182804 ||  || — || January 8, 2002 || Socorro || LINEAR || — || align=right | 4.6 km || 
|-id=805 bgcolor=#d6d6d6
| 182805 ||  || — || January 8, 2002 || Socorro || LINEAR || — || align=right | 4.4 km || 
|-id=806 bgcolor=#d6d6d6
| 182806 ||  || — || January 9, 2002 || Socorro || LINEAR || — || align=right | 4.5 km || 
|-id=807 bgcolor=#d6d6d6
| 182807 ||  || — || January 9, 2002 || Socorro || LINEAR || — || align=right | 3.2 km || 
|-id=808 bgcolor=#d6d6d6
| 182808 ||  || — || January 9, 2002 || Socorro || LINEAR || EOS || align=right | 5.1 km || 
|-id=809 bgcolor=#d6d6d6
| 182809 ||  || — || January 11, 2002 || Socorro || LINEAR || — || align=right | 5.5 km || 
|-id=810 bgcolor=#fefefe
| 182810 ||  || — || January 13, 2002 || Socorro || LINEAR || H || align=right data-sort-value="0.98" | 980 m || 
|-id=811 bgcolor=#d6d6d6
| 182811 ||  || — || January 8, 2002 || Socorro || LINEAR || — || align=right | 3.2 km || 
|-id=812 bgcolor=#d6d6d6
| 182812 ||  || — || January 13, 2002 || Socorro || LINEAR || URS || align=right | 4.9 km || 
|-id=813 bgcolor=#E9E9E9
| 182813 ||  || — || January 13, 2002 || Socorro || LINEAR || — || align=right | 2.2 km || 
|-id=814 bgcolor=#d6d6d6
| 182814 ||  || — || January 14, 2002 || Socorro || LINEAR || — || align=right | 3.4 km || 
|-id=815 bgcolor=#d6d6d6
| 182815 ||  || — || January 14, 2002 || Socorro || LINEAR || EOS || align=right | 3.8 km || 
|-id=816 bgcolor=#d6d6d6
| 182816 ||  || — || January 14, 2002 || Socorro || LINEAR || EOS || align=right | 4.1 km || 
|-id=817 bgcolor=#d6d6d6
| 182817 ||  || — || January 14, 2002 || Socorro || LINEAR || — || align=right | 5.8 km || 
|-id=818 bgcolor=#d6d6d6
| 182818 ||  || — || January 13, 2002 || Socorro || LINEAR || — || align=right | 3.7 km || 
|-id=819 bgcolor=#d6d6d6
| 182819 ||  || — || January 7, 2002 || Palomar || NEAT || — || align=right | 2.8 km || 
|-id=820 bgcolor=#d6d6d6
| 182820 ||  || — || January 8, 2002 || Socorro || LINEAR || CHA || align=right | 3.2 km || 
|-id=821 bgcolor=#d6d6d6
| 182821 ||  || — || January 8, 2002 || Socorro || LINEAR || — || align=right | 4.4 km || 
|-id=822 bgcolor=#d6d6d6
| 182822 ||  || — || January 11, 2002 || Anderson Mesa || LONEOS || — || align=right | 4.5 km || 
|-id=823 bgcolor=#d6d6d6
| 182823 ||  || — || January 11, 2002 || Anderson Mesa || LONEOS || 637 || align=right | 3.3 km || 
|-id=824 bgcolor=#d6d6d6
| 182824 ||  || — || January 12, 2002 || Campo Imperatore || CINEOS || — || align=right | 3.7 km || 
|-id=825 bgcolor=#d6d6d6
| 182825 ||  || — || January 12, 2002 || Kitt Peak || Spacewatch || — || align=right | 3.2 km || 
|-id=826 bgcolor=#d6d6d6
| 182826 ||  || — || January 8, 2002 || Kitt Peak || Spacewatch || THM || align=right | 2.5 km || 
|-id=827 bgcolor=#d6d6d6
| 182827 ||  || — || January 14, 2002 || Palomar || NEAT || EOS || align=right | 3.3 km || 
|-id=828 bgcolor=#d6d6d6
| 182828 ||  || — || January 20, 2002 || Anderson Mesa || LONEOS || EOS || align=right | 3.4 km || 
|-id=829 bgcolor=#d6d6d6
| 182829 ||  || — || January 19, 2002 || Anderson Mesa || LONEOS || — || align=right | 4.5 km || 
|-id=830 bgcolor=#d6d6d6
| 182830 ||  || — || January 23, 2002 || Socorro || LINEAR || 629 || align=right | 1.9 km || 
|-id=831 bgcolor=#d6d6d6
| 182831 ||  || — || January 19, 2002 || Anderson Mesa || LONEOS || — || align=right | 4.1 km || 
|-id=832 bgcolor=#d6d6d6
| 182832 ||  || — || January 21, 2002 || Anderson Mesa || LONEOS || THB || align=right | 3.9 km || 
|-id=833 bgcolor=#d6d6d6
| 182833 ||  || — || February 2, 2002 || Cima Ekar || ADAS || — || align=right | 4.3 km || 
|-id=834 bgcolor=#d6d6d6
| 182834 ||  || — || February 3, 2002 || Palomar || NEAT || — || align=right | 4.6 km || 
|-id=835 bgcolor=#d6d6d6
| 182835 ||  || — || February 6, 2002 || Socorro || LINEAR || — || align=right | 6.0 km || 
|-id=836 bgcolor=#d6d6d6
| 182836 ||  || — || February 6, 2002 || Fountain Hills || C. W. Juels, P. R. Holvorcem || — || align=right | 5.1 km || 
|-id=837 bgcolor=#d6d6d6
| 182837 ||  || — || February 6, 2002 || Kitt Peak || Spacewatch || — || align=right | 3.0 km || 
|-id=838 bgcolor=#d6d6d6
| 182838 ||  || — || February 9, 2002 || Desert Eagle || W. K. Y. Yeung || — || align=right | 3.8 km || 
|-id=839 bgcolor=#fefefe
| 182839 ||  || — || February 6, 2002 || Socorro || LINEAR || H || align=right | 1.3 km || 
|-id=840 bgcolor=#d6d6d6
| 182840 ||  || — || February 6, 2002 || Socorro || LINEAR || — || align=right | 4.3 km || 
|-id=841 bgcolor=#d6d6d6
| 182841 ||  || — || February 6, 2002 || Socorro || LINEAR || URS || align=right | 5.7 km || 
|-id=842 bgcolor=#d6d6d6
| 182842 ||  || — || February 4, 2002 || Palomar || NEAT || — || align=right | 5.3 km || 
|-id=843 bgcolor=#d6d6d6
| 182843 ||  || — || February 3, 2002 || Haleakala || NEAT || — || align=right | 6.7 km || 
|-id=844 bgcolor=#d6d6d6
| 182844 ||  || — || February 7, 2002 || Kitt Peak || Spacewatch || — || align=right | 4.3 km || 
|-id=845 bgcolor=#d6d6d6
| 182845 ||  || — || February 6, 2002 || Socorro || LINEAR || — || align=right | 5.6 km || 
|-id=846 bgcolor=#d6d6d6
| 182846 ||  || — || February 7, 2002 || Socorro || LINEAR || — || align=right | 4.3 km || 
|-id=847 bgcolor=#fefefe
| 182847 ||  || — || February 7, 2002 || Socorro || LINEAR || — || align=right data-sort-value="0.99" | 990 m || 
|-id=848 bgcolor=#d6d6d6
| 182848 ||  || — || February 7, 2002 || Socorro || LINEAR || THM || align=right | 5.3 km || 
|-id=849 bgcolor=#d6d6d6
| 182849 ||  || — || February 7, 2002 || Socorro || LINEAR || — || align=right | 4.3 km || 
|-id=850 bgcolor=#d6d6d6
| 182850 ||  || — || February 7, 2002 || Socorro || LINEAR || — || align=right | 6.4 km || 
|-id=851 bgcolor=#d6d6d6
| 182851 ||  || — || February 7, 2002 || Socorro || LINEAR || THM || align=right | 3.2 km || 
|-id=852 bgcolor=#d6d6d6
| 182852 ||  || — || February 7, 2002 || Socorro || LINEAR || HYG || align=right | 4.1 km || 
|-id=853 bgcolor=#d6d6d6
| 182853 ||  || — || February 7, 2002 || Socorro || LINEAR || URS || align=right | 6.6 km || 
|-id=854 bgcolor=#d6d6d6
| 182854 ||  || — || February 7, 2002 || Socorro || LINEAR || HYG || align=right | 4.3 km || 
|-id=855 bgcolor=#d6d6d6
| 182855 ||  || — || February 7, 2002 || Socorro || LINEAR || — || align=right | 3.6 km || 
|-id=856 bgcolor=#d6d6d6
| 182856 ||  || — || February 7, 2002 || Socorro || LINEAR || — || align=right | 3.7 km || 
|-id=857 bgcolor=#d6d6d6
| 182857 ||  || — || February 10, 2002 || Socorro || LINEAR || — || align=right | 4.4 km || 
|-id=858 bgcolor=#d6d6d6
| 182858 ||  || — || February 10, 2002 || Socorro || LINEAR || — || align=right | 4.6 km || 
|-id=859 bgcolor=#d6d6d6
| 182859 ||  || — || February 10, 2002 || Socorro || LINEAR || THM || align=right | 3.8 km || 
|-id=860 bgcolor=#d6d6d6
| 182860 ||  || — || February 10, 2002 || Socorro || LINEAR || — || align=right | 4.4 km || 
|-id=861 bgcolor=#d6d6d6
| 182861 ||  || — || February 10, 2002 || Socorro || LINEAR || — || align=right | 4.1 km || 
|-id=862 bgcolor=#d6d6d6
| 182862 ||  || — || February 8, 2002 || Socorro || LINEAR || HYG || align=right | 6.7 km || 
|-id=863 bgcolor=#d6d6d6
| 182863 ||  || — || February 10, 2002 || Socorro || LINEAR || — || align=right | 3.4 km || 
|-id=864 bgcolor=#d6d6d6
| 182864 ||  || — || February 10, 2002 || Socorro || LINEAR || THM || align=right | 2.7 km || 
|-id=865 bgcolor=#d6d6d6
| 182865 ||  || — || February 10, 2002 || Socorro || LINEAR || — || align=right | 3.6 km || 
|-id=866 bgcolor=#fefefe
| 182866 ||  || — || February 10, 2002 || Socorro || LINEAR || — || align=right data-sort-value="0.86" | 860 m || 
|-id=867 bgcolor=#d6d6d6
| 182867 ||  || — || February 10, 2002 || Socorro || LINEAR || VER || align=right | 4.9 km || 
|-id=868 bgcolor=#d6d6d6
| 182868 ||  || — || February 10, 2002 || Socorro || LINEAR || — || align=right | 4.9 km || 
|-id=869 bgcolor=#d6d6d6
| 182869 ||  || — || February 10, 2002 || Socorro || LINEAR || EOS || align=right | 3.9 km || 
|-id=870 bgcolor=#d6d6d6
| 182870 ||  || — || February 10, 2002 || Socorro || LINEAR || HYG || align=right | 3.7 km || 
|-id=871 bgcolor=#d6d6d6
| 182871 ||  || — || February 10, 2002 || Socorro || LINEAR || — || align=right | 3.8 km || 
|-id=872 bgcolor=#d6d6d6
| 182872 ||  || — || February 10, 2002 || Socorro || LINEAR || — || align=right | 3.8 km || 
|-id=873 bgcolor=#d6d6d6
| 182873 ||  || — || February 11, 2002 || Socorro || LINEAR || HYG || align=right | 3.3 km || 
|-id=874 bgcolor=#d6d6d6
| 182874 ||  || — || February 11, 2002 || Kitt Peak || Spacewatch || HYG || align=right | 4.8 km || 
|-id=875 bgcolor=#d6d6d6
| 182875 ||  || — || February 11, 2002 || Socorro || LINEAR || — || align=right | 4.0 km || 
|-id=876 bgcolor=#d6d6d6
| 182876 ||  || — || February 11, 2002 || Socorro || LINEAR || HYG || align=right | 3.8 km || 
|-id=877 bgcolor=#d6d6d6
| 182877 ||  || — || February 11, 2002 || Socorro || LINEAR || — || align=right | 6.3 km || 
|-id=878 bgcolor=#d6d6d6
| 182878 ||  || — || February 15, 2002 || Socorro || LINEAR || LIX || align=right | 7.6 km || 
|-id=879 bgcolor=#d6d6d6
| 182879 ||  || — || February 4, 2002 || Anderson Mesa || LONEOS || EOS || align=right | 2.9 km || 
|-id=880 bgcolor=#d6d6d6
| 182880 ||  || — || February 3, 2002 || Haleakala || NEAT || TIR || align=right | 6.3 km || 
|-id=881 bgcolor=#d6d6d6
| 182881 ||  || — || February 5, 2002 || Palomar || NEAT || HYG || align=right | 3.4 km || 
|-id=882 bgcolor=#d6d6d6
| 182882 ||  || — || February 6, 2002 || Palomar || NEAT || — || align=right | 4.2 km || 
|-id=883 bgcolor=#d6d6d6
| 182883 ||  || — || February 6, 2002 || Palomar || NEAT || — || align=right | 5.5 km || 
|-id=884 bgcolor=#d6d6d6
| 182884 ||  || — || February 6, 2002 || Socorro || LINEAR || — || align=right | 4.4 km || 
|-id=885 bgcolor=#d6d6d6
| 182885 ||  || — || February 7, 2002 || Palomar || NEAT || — || align=right | 3.1 km || 
|-id=886 bgcolor=#d6d6d6
| 182886 ||  || — || February 8, 2002 || Kitt Peak || Spacewatch || HYG || align=right | 3.4 km || 
|-id=887 bgcolor=#d6d6d6
| 182887 ||  || — || February 11, 2002 || Socorro || LINEAR || — || align=right | 5.1 km || 
|-id=888 bgcolor=#d6d6d6
| 182888 ||  || — || February 10, 2002 || Anderson Mesa || LONEOS || Tj (2.99) || align=right | 4.5 km || 
|-id=889 bgcolor=#d6d6d6
| 182889 ||  || — || February 11, 2002 || Socorro || LINEAR || HYG || align=right | 4.3 km || 
|-id=890 bgcolor=#d6d6d6
| 182890 ||  || — || February 12, 2002 || Socorro || LINEAR || — || align=right | 5.5 km || 
|-id=891 bgcolor=#d6d6d6
| 182891 ||  || — || February 12, 2002 || Socorro || LINEAR || — || align=right | 5.3 km || 
|-id=892 bgcolor=#d6d6d6
| 182892 ||  || — || February 10, 2002 || Socorro || LINEAR || HYG || align=right | 4.1 km || 
|-id=893 bgcolor=#d6d6d6
| 182893 ||  || — || February 20, 2002 || Socorro || LINEAR || THM || align=right | 3.1 km || 
|-id=894 bgcolor=#d6d6d6
| 182894 ||  || — || February 20, 2002 || Socorro || LINEAR || — || align=right | 5.8 km || 
|-id=895 bgcolor=#d6d6d6
| 182895 ||  || — || February 21, 2002 || Socorro || LINEAR || — || align=right | 5.4 km || 
|-id=896 bgcolor=#d6d6d6
| 182896 ||  || — || February 16, 2002 || Palomar || NEAT || — || align=right | 3.3 km || 
|-id=897 bgcolor=#d6d6d6
| 182897 ||  || — || March 10, 2002 || Cima Ekar || ADAS || THM || align=right | 3.6 km || 
|-id=898 bgcolor=#d6d6d6
| 182898 ||  || — || March 14, 2002 || Desert Eagle || W. K. Y. Yeung || — || align=right | 4.0 km || 
|-id=899 bgcolor=#d6d6d6
| 182899 ||  || — || March 5, 2002 || Palomar || NEAT || — || align=right | 5.3 km || 
|-id=900 bgcolor=#d6d6d6
| 182900 ||  || — || March 5, 2002 || Palomar || NEAT || — || align=right | 3.8 km || 
|}

182901–183000 

|-bgcolor=#d6d6d6
| 182901 ||  || — || March 10, 2002 || Anderson Mesa || LONEOS || — || align=right | 6.7 km || 
|-id=902 bgcolor=#d6d6d6
| 182902 ||  || — || March 9, 2002 || Socorro || LINEAR || — || align=right | 3.8 km || 
|-id=903 bgcolor=#d6d6d6
| 182903 ||  || — || March 13, 2002 || Socorro || LINEAR || — || align=right | 5.4 km || 
|-id=904 bgcolor=#d6d6d6
| 182904 ||  || — || March 13, 2002 || Socorro || LINEAR || HYG || align=right | 3.8 km || 
|-id=905 bgcolor=#E9E9E9
| 182905 ||  || — || March 13, 2002 || Socorro || LINEAR || PAD || align=right | 3.3 km || 
|-id=906 bgcolor=#d6d6d6
| 182906 ||  || — || March 13, 2002 || Socorro || LINEAR || — || align=right | 4.6 km || 
|-id=907 bgcolor=#d6d6d6
| 182907 ||  || — || March 13, 2002 || Palomar || NEAT || — || align=right | 3.3 km || 
|-id=908 bgcolor=#d6d6d6
| 182908 ||  || — || March 12, 2002 || Socorro || LINEAR || — || align=right | 5.3 km || 
|-id=909 bgcolor=#fefefe
| 182909 ||  || — || March 12, 2002 || Socorro || LINEAR || — || align=right | 1.1 km || 
|-id=910 bgcolor=#d6d6d6
| 182910 ||  || — || March 2, 2002 || Uccle || Uccle Obs. || — || align=right | 5.1 km || 
|-id=911 bgcolor=#d6d6d6
| 182911 ||  || — || March 6, 2002 || Palomar || NEAT || — || align=right | 3.8 km || 
|-id=912 bgcolor=#d6d6d6
| 182912 ||  || — || March 9, 2002 || Anderson Mesa || LONEOS || LIX || align=right | 6.5 km || 
|-id=913 bgcolor=#d6d6d6
| 182913 ||  || — || March 9, 2002 || Anderson Mesa || LONEOS || — || align=right | 6.1 km || 
|-id=914 bgcolor=#d6d6d6
| 182914 ||  || — || March 9, 2002 || Kitt Peak || Spacewatch || HYG || align=right | 3.5 km || 
|-id=915 bgcolor=#d6d6d6
| 182915 ||  || — || March 10, 2002 || Kitt Peak || Spacewatch || THM || align=right | 3.2 km || 
|-id=916 bgcolor=#d6d6d6
| 182916 ||  || — || March 9, 2002 || Kitt Peak || Spacewatch || — || align=right | 4.0 km || 
|-id=917 bgcolor=#d6d6d6
| 182917 ||  || — || March 12, 2002 || Anderson Mesa || LONEOS || — || align=right | 5.4 km || 
|-id=918 bgcolor=#d6d6d6
| 182918 ||  || — || March 13, 2002 || Kitt Peak || Spacewatch || — || align=right | 3.8 km || 
|-id=919 bgcolor=#d6d6d6
| 182919 ||  || — || March 13, 2002 || Socorro || LINEAR || — || align=right | 4.8 km || 
|-id=920 bgcolor=#d6d6d6
| 182920 ||  || — || March 13, 2002 || Palomar || NEAT || ALA || align=right | 5.0 km || 
|-id=921 bgcolor=#d6d6d6
| 182921 ||  || — || March 12, 2002 || Palomar || NEAT || EOS || align=right | 3.5 km || 
|-id=922 bgcolor=#d6d6d6
| 182922 ||  || — || March 6, 2002 || Palomar || NEAT || THM || align=right | 2.9 km || 
|-id=923 bgcolor=#d6d6d6
| 182923 ||  || — || March 13, 2002 || Palomar || NEAT || — || align=right | 4.5 km || 
|-id=924 bgcolor=#d6d6d6
| 182924 ||  || — || March 12, 2002 || Palomar || NEAT || — || align=right | 4.0 km || 
|-id=925 bgcolor=#d6d6d6
| 182925 ||  || — || March 12, 2002 || Apache Point || SDSS || URS || align=right | 6.5 km || 
|-id=926 bgcolor=#C2E0FF
| 182926 ||  || — || March 20, 2002 || Mauna Kea || B. Gladman, J. J. Kavelaars, A. Doressoundiram || cubewano (cold)critical || align=right | 147 km || 
|-id=927 bgcolor=#d6d6d6
| 182927 ||  || — || March 19, 2002 || Palomar || NEAT || EUP || align=right | 8.1 km || 
|-id=928 bgcolor=#d6d6d6
| 182928 ||  || — || March 20, 2002 || Socorro || LINEAR || — || align=right | 5.5 km || 
|-id=929 bgcolor=#d6d6d6
| 182929 ||  || — || March 20, 2002 || Anderson Mesa || LONEOS || HYG || align=right | 4.4 km || 
|-id=930 bgcolor=#d6d6d6
| 182930 ||  || — || March 21, 2002 || Socorro || LINEAR || LUT || align=right | 6.6 km || 
|-id=931 bgcolor=#d6d6d6
| 182931 ||  || — || April 4, 2002 || Haleakala || NEAT || 7:4 || align=right | 8.7 km || 
|-id=932 bgcolor=#d6d6d6
| 182932 ||  || — || April 4, 2002 || Socorro || LINEAR || Tj (2.91) || align=right | 8.9 km || 
|-id=933 bgcolor=#C2E0FF
| 182933 ||  || — || April 6, 2002 || Cerro Tololo || M. W. Buie || SDOmooncritical || align=right | 233 km || 
|-id=934 bgcolor=#C2E0FF
| 182934 ||  || — || April 8, 2002 || Cerro Tololo || M. W. Buie || cubewano?critical || align=right | 369 km || 
|-id=935 bgcolor=#d6d6d6
| 182935 ||  || — || April 4, 2002 || Palomar || NEAT || — || align=right | 6.5 km || 
|-id=936 bgcolor=#d6d6d6
| 182936 ||  || — || April 4, 2002 || Haleakala || NEAT || — || align=right | 7.8 km || 
|-id=937 bgcolor=#fefefe
| 182937 ||  || — || April 4, 2002 || Kitt Peak || Spacewatch || NYS || align=right data-sort-value="0.88" | 880 m || 
|-id=938 bgcolor=#d6d6d6
| 182938 ||  || — || April 4, 2002 || Palomar || NEAT || — || align=right | 5.2 km || 
|-id=939 bgcolor=#d6d6d6
| 182939 ||  || — || April 5, 2002 || Anderson Mesa || LONEOS || HYG || align=right | 5.2 km || 
|-id=940 bgcolor=#d6d6d6
| 182940 ||  || — || April 5, 2002 || Palomar || NEAT || — || align=right | 6.4 km || 
|-id=941 bgcolor=#d6d6d6
| 182941 ||  || — || April 8, 2002 || Palomar || NEAT || TIR || align=right | 4.7 km || 
|-id=942 bgcolor=#d6d6d6
| 182942 ||  || — || April 8, 2002 || Palomar || NEAT || LUT || align=right | 7.8 km || 
|-id=943 bgcolor=#d6d6d6
| 182943 ||  || — || April 9, 2002 || Kitt Peak || Spacewatch || URS || align=right | 5.2 km || 
|-id=944 bgcolor=#fefefe
| 182944 ||  || — || April 10, 2002 || Socorro || LINEAR || — || align=right | 2.5 km || 
|-id=945 bgcolor=#d6d6d6
| 182945 ||  || — || April 10, 2002 || Socorro || LINEAR || — || align=right | 5.5 km || 
|-id=946 bgcolor=#d6d6d6
| 182946 ||  || — || April 11, 2002 || Anderson Mesa || LONEOS || — || align=right | 6.2 km || 
|-id=947 bgcolor=#d6d6d6
| 182947 ||  || — || April 10, 2002 || Socorro || LINEAR || — || align=right | 6.4 km || 
|-id=948 bgcolor=#d6d6d6
| 182948 ||  || — || April 10, 2002 || Palomar || NEAT || — || align=right | 3.6 km || 
|-id=949 bgcolor=#d6d6d6
| 182949 ||  || — || April 13, 2002 || Palomar || NEAT || VER || align=right | 5.7 km || 
|-id=950 bgcolor=#d6d6d6
| 182950 ||  || — || April 14, 2002 || Kitt Peak || Spacewatch || — || align=right | 6.8 km || 
|-id=951 bgcolor=#d6d6d6
| 182951 ||  || — || April 5, 2002 || Palomar || M. White, M. Collins || — || align=right | 3.9 km || 
|-id=952 bgcolor=#d6d6d6
| 182952 ||  || — || April 18, 2002 || Kitt Peak || Spacewatch || THM || align=right | 3.5 km || 
|-id=953 bgcolor=#d6d6d6
| 182953 ||  || — || April 21, 2002 || Socorro || LINEAR || EUP || align=right | 7.9 km || 
|-id=954 bgcolor=#d6d6d6
| 182954 ||  || — || May 3, 2002 || Kitt Peak || Spacewatch || 7:4 || align=right | 7.2 km || 
|-id=955 bgcolor=#d6d6d6
| 182955 ||  || — || May 6, 2002 || Socorro || LINEAR || EUP || align=right | 9.1 km || 
|-id=956 bgcolor=#fefefe
| 182956 ||  || — || May 8, 2002 || Socorro || LINEAR || — || align=right | 1.6 km || 
|-id=957 bgcolor=#fefefe
| 182957 ||  || — || May 10, 2002 || Socorro || LINEAR || FLO || align=right data-sort-value="0.81" | 810 m || 
|-id=958 bgcolor=#fefefe
| 182958 ||  || — || May 8, 2002 || Socorro || LINEAR || FLO || align=right | 1.2 km || 
|-id=959 bgcolor=#fefefe
| 182959 ||  || — || May 11, 2002 || Socorro || LINEAR || — || align=right data-sort-value="0.99" | 990 m || 
|-id=960 bgcolor=#d6d6d6
| 182960 ||  || — || May 6, 2002 || Socorro || LINEAR || — || align=right | 6.6 km || 
|-id=961 bgcolor=#d6d6d6
| 182961 ||  || — || May 4, 2002 || Palomar || NEAT || — || align=right | 8.4 km || 
|-id=962 bgcolor=#d6d6d6
| 182962 ||  || — || May 5, 2002 || Palomar || NEAT || MEL || align=right | 6.3 km || 
|-id=963 bgcolor=#fefefe
| 182963 ||  || — || May 6, 2002 || Anderson Mesa || LONEOS || FLO || align=right data-sort-value="0.95" | 950 m || 
|-id=964 bgcolor=#fefefe
| 182964 ||  || — || May 9, 2002 || Palomar || NEAT || — || align=right data-sort-value="0.77" | 770 m || 
|-id=965 bgcolor=#fefefe
| 182965 ||  || — || May 29, 2002 || Haleakala || NEAT || — || align=right data-sort-value="0.97" | 970 m || 
|-id=966 bgcolor=#fefefe
| 182966 ||  || — || June 5, 2002 || Socorro || LINEAR || V || align=right | 1.1 km || 
|-id=967 bgcolor=#fefefe
| 182967 ||  || — || June 8, 2002 || Socorro || LINEAR || FLO || align=right | 1.2 km || 
|-id=968 bgcolor=#E9E9E9
| 182968 ||  || — || June 7, 2002 || Palomar || NEAT || — || align=right | 2.0 km || 
|-id=969 bgcolor=#fefefe
| 182969 ||  || — || June 29, 2002 || Palomar || NEAT || V || align=right data-sort-value="0.97" | 970 m || 
|-id=970 bgcolor=#fefefe
| 182970 ||  || — || July 5, 2002 || Socorro || LINEAR || FLO || align=right data-sort-value="0.94" | 940 m || 
|-id=971 bgcolor=#fefefe
| 182971 ||  || — || July 5, 2002 || Socorro || LINEAR || FLO || align=right data-sort-value="0.97" | 970 m || 
|-id=972 bgcolor=#fefefe
| 182972 ||  || — || July 9, 2002 || Socorro || LINEAR || — || align=right | 1.1 km || 
|-id=973 bgcolor=#fefefe
| 182973 ||  || — || July 9, 2002 || Socorro || LINEAR || FLO || align=right data-sort-value="0.88" | 880 m || 
|-id=974 bgcolor=#FA8072
| 182974 ||  || — || July 9, 2002 || Socorro || LINEAR || — || align=right | 1.7 km || 
|-id=975 bgcolor=#fefefe
| 182975 ||  || — || July 9, 2002 || Socorro || LINEAR || — || align=right | 1.2 km || 
|-id=976 bgcolor=#fefefe
| 182976 ||  || — || July 9, 2002 || Socorro || LINEAR || — || align=right | 1.3 km || 
|-id=977 bgcolor=#FA8072
| 182977 ||  || — || July 14, 2002 || Socorro || LINEAR || — || align=right data-sort-value="0.99" | 990 m || 
|-id=978 bgcolor=#fefefe
| 182978 ||  || — || July 14, 2002 || Palomar || NEAT || — || align=right | 1.1 km || 
|-id=979 bgcolor=#E9E9E9
| 182979 ||  || — || July 14, 2002 || Palomar || NEAT || EUN || align=right | 1.3 km || 
|-id=980 bgcolor=#E9E9E9
| 182980 ||  || — || July 13, 2002 || Haleakala || NEAT || — || align=right | 2.2 km || 
|-id=981 bgcolor=#fefefe
| 182981 ||  || — || July 5, 2002 || Socorro || LINEAR || — || align=right | 1.5 km || 
|-id=982 bgcolor=#E9E9E9
| 182982 ||  || — || July 6, 2002 || Palomar || NEAT || — || align=right | 1.4 km || 
|-id=983 bgcolor=#fefefe
| 182983 ||  || — || July 5, 2002 || Palomar || NEAT || FLO || align=right data-sort-value="0.93" | 930 m || 
|-id=984 bgcolor=#fefefe
| 182984 || 2002 OV || — || July 17, 2002 || Socorro || LINEAR || — || align=right data-sort-value="0.97" | 970 m || 
|-id=985 bgcolor=#fefefe
| 182985 ||  || — || July 17, 2002 || Socorro || LINEAR || FLO || align=right | 1.1 km || 
|-id=986 bgcolor=#fefefe
| 182986 ||  || — || July 17, 2002 || Socorro || LINEAR || — || align=right | 1.3 km || 
|-id=987 bgcolor=#E9E9E9
| 182987 ||  || — || July 18, 2002 || Palomar || NEAT || GEF || align=right | 1.9 km || 
|-id=988 bgcolor=#fefefe
| 182988 ||  || — || July 19, 2002 || Palomar || NEAT || V || align=right data-sort-value="0.76" | 760 m || 
|-id=989 bgcolor=#E9E9E9
| 182989 ||  || — || July 18, 2002 || Socorro || LINEAR || — || align=right | 1.4 km || 
|-id=990 bgcolor=#fefefe
| 182990 ||  || — || July 18, 2002 || Socorro || LINEAR || — || align=right | 1.2 km || 
|-id=991 bgcolor=#fefefe
| 182991 ||  || — || July 30, 2002 || Haleakala || A. Lowe || FLO || align=right data-sort-value="0.74" | 740 m || 
|-id=992 bgcolor=#fefefe
| 182992 ||  || — || July 16, 2002 || Palomar || NEAT || V || align=right data-sort-value="0.99" | 990 m || 
|-id=993 bgcolor=#fefefe
| 182993 ||  || — || August 4, 2002 || El Centro || W. K. Y. Yeung || FLO || align=right | 1.1 km || 
|-id=994 bgcolor=#fefefe
| 182994 ||  || — || August 5, 2002 || Campo Imperatore || CINEOS || NYS || align=right data-sort-value="0.72" | 720 m || 
|-id=995 bgcolor=#fefefe
| 182995 ||  || — || August 6, 2002 || Palomar || NEAT || — || align=right data-sort-value="0.66" | 660 m || 
|-id=996 bgcolor=#fefefe
| 182996 ||  || — || August 6, 2002 || Palomar || NEAT || — || align=right | 1.2 km || 
|-id=997 bgcolor=#fefefe
| 182997 ||  || — || August 6, 2002 || Palomar || NEAT || — || align=right | 1.2 km || 
|-id=998 bgcolor=#fefefe
| 182998 ||  || — || August 5, 2002 || Campo Imperatore || CINEOS || FLO || align=right data-sort-value="0.88" | 880 m || 
|-id=999 bgcolor=#fefefe
| 182999 ||  || — || August 5, 2002 || Socorro || LINEAR || — || align=right | 1.4 km || 
|-id=000 bgcolor=#fefefe
| 183000 ||  || — || August 9, 2002 || Socorro || LINEAR || — || align=right | 1.7 km || 
|}

References

External links 
 Discovery Circumstances: Numbered Minor Planets (180001)–(185000) (IAU Minor Planet Center)

0182